The spark-ignition petrol engines listed below operate on the four-stroke cycle, and unless stated otherwise, use a wet sump lubrication system, and are water-cooled.

Since the Volkswagen Group is German, official internal combustion engine performance ratings are published using the International System of Units (commonly abbreviated "SI"), a modern form of the metric system of figures. Motor vehicle engines will have been tested by a Deutsches Institut für Normung (DIN) accredited testing facility, to either the original 80/1269/EEC, or the later 1999/99/EC standards.  The standard initial measuring unit for establishing the rated motive power output is the kilowatt (kW); and in their official literature, the power rating may be published in either the kW, or the metric horsepower (often abbreviated "PS" for the German word Pferdestärke), or both, and may also include conversions to imperial units such as the horsepower (hp) or brake horsepower (bhp).  (Conversions: one PS = 735.5 watts (W); ˜ 0.98632 hp (SAE)). In case of conflict, the metric power figure of kilowatts (kW) will be stated as the primary figure of reference. For the turning force generated by the engine, the Newton metre (Nm) will be the reference figure of torque. Furthermore, in accordance with European automotive traditions, engines shall be listed in the following ascending order of preference:
Number of cylinders,
Engine displacement (in litres),
Engine configuration, and
Rated motive power output (in kilowatts).

The petrol engines which Volkswagen Group previously manufactured and installed are in the list of discontinued Volkswagen Group petrol engines article.

EA111
The EA111 series of internal combustion engines was initially developed by Audi under Ludwig Kraus's leadership and introduced in 1974 in the Audi 50 and shortly after, in the original Volkswagen Polo. It is a series of water-cooled inline three- and inline four-cylinder petrol and diesel engines, in a variety of displacement sizes. This overhead camshaft engine features a crossflow cylinder head design. The camshaft is driven by a toothed belt from the crankshaft, this belt also provides the drive for coolant pump. The oil pump is directly driven by crankshaft, petrol pump and distributor are driven by camshaft. Other "V" belt-driven accessories are the alternator and (if fitted) power steering, and air-conditioning pump. In transverse mount configuration, the exhaust side is towards the vehicle firewall, in longitudinal configuration, the exhaust side is to the right as you face front in either left or right-hand drive vehicles.

EA211

The EA211 engines are a completely new four-cylinder turbocharged and direct-injection TSI engines. Compared to its predecessor, the EA211 series is significantly more compact, with installation length  shorter, thus offering more interior space. The installation position of the engines has also been optimised. Just as in the diesels, the petrol engines are now mounted with the exhaust side facing backwards and tilted at an angle of 12 degrees. The crankshaft alone became lighter by 20 per cent; the connecting rods lost 30 per cent of their weight. In addition the connecting rod bearing journals are now hollow-drilled and pistons now come with flat bottoms, all of them optimized for lower weight.
Regarding thermal management, the EA211 petrol engine is equipped with a modern dual-circuit cooling system. That means that a high temperature circuit with a mechanically driven cooling pump cools the basic engine, while a low temperature circuit flows through the intercooler and the turbo-charger casing. The cylinder-head circuit heats the cabin's interior. The exhaust manifold is integrated into the cylinder head, enabling the engine to warm up more quickly, in turn making heat available quickly for the passenger cabin. At high loads, the exhaust is cooled by the coolant, lowering fuel consumption.

EA 824, EA 825
EA 824 and EA 825 are families of twin turbo 90 degrees V8 spark ignition engines.

Audi uses the EA 824, while Porsche uses EA 825 for Panamera Turbo.

EA 825 uses two twin-scroll turbochargers, iron coating on the cylinder linings,  fuel injector at centre of combustion chamber, cylinder deactivation at 950-3500rpm with a  torque limit.

EA 839
EA 839 is a family of turbocharged 90 degrees V6 spark ignition engines.

EA888
The EA888 engines are a family of three and four-cylinder engines that are currently in use across the Volkswagen Group. An EA888 family is a corporate VAG designed unit that is an evolution of the earlier EA827/113 units. It features some of the latest engine technology such as direct fuel injection, sintered camshaft lobes, thin-walled engine block, variable valve timing and lift for intake and exhaust valves, downstream oxygen sensors, exhaust manifold integrated into the cylinder head, exhaust gas recirculation and cooling, distributors coil-on-plug ignition, lightweight engine internals, slide valve thermostat (some variants), and the addition of port fuel injection to aid low load fuel consumption and cold start emissions. The port fuel injection also aids in reducing the potential carbon deposits that can occur in direct-injected engines. As of 2016, the 'dual injection' system has not been offered in North American markets. Still, VAG has made numerous enhancements to their engine designs such as the positive crankcase ventilation, repositioning injectors and more to lessen the potential that carbon deposits accumulate on intake valves. Currently, the EA888 engine is available in two sizes: 1.8T and 2.0T. A concept car based on the Volkswagen Golf R, dubbed R400, produced 395 hp from 2 litres of displacement. Furthermore, the R400 would be able to accelerate from 0–100 km/h in just 3.8 seconds, thanks to a haldex 4-wheel drive system, and a 6 or 7-speed DSG gearbox.

Three-cylinder petrols

1.0 R3 12v (EA211)
The new fuel-saving engine presented at the 2012 Geneva Motor Show
identificationparts code prefix: 04E, ID code: CHYA, CHYB, CHZD, CSEB, DHSB
engine displacement & engine configuration  inline three engine (R3/I3); bore x stroke: , bore spacing: , stroke ratio: 0.99:1 – 'square engine',  cylinder, compression ratio: 10.5:1
cylinder block & crankcase cast aluminium alloy; four main bearings, die-forged steel crankshaft
cylinder head & valvetrain cast aluminium alloy; four valves per cylinder, 12 valves total, double overhead camshaft (DOHC)
aspiration  natural and turbocharged
fuel system multi-point electronic indirect fuel injection with three intake manifold-sited fuel injectors
DIN-rated motive power & torque outputs
 at 5,000–6,000 rpm;  at 3,000–4,300 rpm (CHYA)
 at 6,200 rpm;  at 3,000–4,300 rpm (CHYB)
 at 6,350 rpm;  at 3,000 rpm with Ethanol (CSEB)
 at 5,000–5,500 rpm;  at 1500–3,500 rpm (CHZB)
 at 5,000–5,500 rpm;  at 2000–3,500 rpm (CHZD)
 at 5,500 rpm;  at 2,000-3,500 rpm with Ethanol (DHSB)
application Volkswagen up!, Skoda Citigo, Skoda Fabia III, Seat Mii, Seat Ibiza, Seat Arona, Volkswagen Golf VII, Volkswagen Polo, Volkswagen T-Roc, Volkswagen T-Cross, Audi A1 (GB), SEAT León (4th Gen)

1.2 R3 (EA111) 
This all-aluminium alloy engine is manufactured at the Škoda Auto plant in Mladá Boleslav.
parts code prefix 03E
engine displacement & engine configuration  inline three engine (R3/I3); bore x stroke: , stroke ratio: 0.88:1 – undersquare/long-stroke, 399.4 cc per cylinder
cylinder block & crankcase cast aluminium alloy; four main bearings, die-forged steel crossplane crankshaft with 120 degree crankpins, gear-driven contra-rotating balance shaft, simplex chain-driven oil pump
cylinder head & valvetrain cast aluminium alloy; low-friction roller finger cam followers with automatic hydraulic valve clearance compensation, simplex roller chain-driven overhead camshaft
6v: two valves per cylinder, 6 valves total, single overhead camshaft (SOHC), compression ratio: 10.3:1
12v: four valves per cylinder, 12 valves total, double overhead camshaft (DOHC), compression ratio: 10.5:1
aspiration plastic intake manifold
fuel system, ignition system & management common rail multi-point electronic sequential indirect fuel injection (MPI) with three intake manifold-sited fuel injectors; three individual spark coils; Siemens SIMOS 91 electronic engine control unit (ECU), EU4 compliant
DIN-rated motive power & torque outputs, ID codes – 6v
 at 4,750 rpm;  at 3,000 rpm — AWY, BMD
 at 5,000 rpm;  at 3,000 rpm — BBM
DIN-rated motive power & torque outputs, ID codes – 12v
 at 5,200 rpm;  at 2,000 rpm — CGPB
 at 5,400 rpm;  at 3,000 rpm — AZQ, BME
 at 5,400 rpm;  at 3,000 rpm — BZG, CEV, CGPA
 at 5,400 rpm;  at 3,750 rpm — CGPC
applications Volkswagen Fox (BMD: 04/05->), Volkswagen Polo Mk4 (9N, PQ24 – AZQ: 11/01-05/04, AWY: 01/02-05/04, BMD: 05/04-05/07, BME: 11/04-07/07, BBM/BZG: 05/07->), Škoda Fabia (AWY: 07/01-05/04, BMD: 05/04-12/07, BME: 12/04-12/07, BBM: 12/06-05/09, BZG: 01/07-05/09, CEV: 01/08->), Škoda Roomster (BME: 05/06-01/07, BZG: 01/07-03/09, CGPA: 03/09->), SEAT Ibiza (BBM: 06/07-05/08, AZQ: 01/02->, BME: 11/04->, BZG: 03/08->), SEAT Cordoba (AZQ: 10/02->, BME: 11/04->), Volkswagen Jetta Konig

Four-cylinder EA827/EA113/EA111/EA211 petrols

The EA827 family of internal combustion engines was initially developed by Audi under Ludwig Kraus leadership and introduced in 1972 in the Audi 80, and was eventually superseded by the EA113 evolution introduced in 1993. Both share the same  cylinder spacing. The latter EA113 was updated with Fuel Stratified Injection (FSI) direct injection, to be topped by the  2.0 TFSI used in the Audi TTS. Forty million engines have been produced. This range will eventually be superseded by the evolved version with heavy changes EA888 project, introduced with the 1.8 TSI/TFSI below, but the EA113 still remains in production.

1.2 TSI/TFSI (EA111) 
This engine is manufactured at the Škoda Auto plant in Mladá Boleslav
identification parts code prefix: 03F, ID codes: CBZA, CBZB, CBZC
engine displacement & engine configuration  inline-four engine (R4/I4); bore x stroke: , stroke ratio: 0.94:1 – undersquare/long-stroke, 299.3 cc per cylinder, compression ratio: 10.5:1,  peak pressures
cylinder block & crankcase cast aluminium alloy, five main bearings, die-forged steel crankshaft
cylinder head & valvetrain cast aluminium alloy; low-friction roller finger cam followers with automatic hydraulic valve clearance compensation
two valves per cylinder, 8 valves total, roller chain-driven single overhead camshaft (SOHC)
aspiration hot-film air mass meter, cast alloy throttle body with electronically controlled Bosch "E-Gas" throttle valve; turbocharger with maximum pressure , water-cooled intercooler integrated into intake manifold
fuel system fully demand-controlled and returnless; – fuel tank–mounted low-pressure fuel pump; Fuel Stratified Injection (FSI): camshaft-driven single-piston high-pressure injection pump supplying up to  fuel pressure in common rail fuel rail, four combustion chamber sited direct injection sequential fuel injectors, mounted on the intake side between the intake port and cylinder head gasket level, homogeneous mixing, stratified lean-burn operation with excess air at part load; 95 RON ultra-low sulphur unleaded petrol (ULSP)
ignition system & engine management centrally positioned longlife spark plugs, mapped direct ignition with four individual direct-acting single spark coils; electronic engine control unit (ECU), knock control via a single knock sensor, permanent lambda control, EU5 compliant
DIN-rated motive power & torque outputs
 at 4,800 rpm;  at 1,500–3,500 rpm — CBZA; Volkswagen Golf Mk6 (05/10->), Audi A1
 at 4,500 rpm;  at 1,500–3,500 rpm — CBZC; Volkswagen Polo (05/11->)
 at 5,000 rpm;  at 1,550–4,100 rpm — CBZB; SEAT Ibiza
applications Volkswagen Beetle (A5), Volkswagen Polo Mk5, Volkswagen Golf Mk6, Volkswagen Caddy (05/09->), SEAT Ibiza, SEAT León (1P), SEAT Altea, SEAT Altea XL, SEAT Toledo (2012) (KG) Škoda Octavia (02/10->), Škoda Yeti, Škoda Fabia (02/10->), Audi A1, Škoda Rapid (2012) (NH)
references auto-motor-sport.de and the Volkswagen press releases to the new Polo 2009

1.2 TSI (EA211)
Main article - Volkswagen_EA211_engine
These newly developed generation of modern petrol engines are manufactured at the Škoda Auto plant in Mladá Boleslav.
identification EA211 engine family. Turbocharged and direct-injection TSI engines with a four-cylinder, four-valve layout and belt driven camshafts.
1.2 TSI 66 kWThe entry-level petrol engine. Turbocharging produces a maximum torque of 160 Nm (at 1,400 to 3,500 rpm).
1.2 TSI 77 kWThe improved performance version of the 1.2 TSI Green tec, which includes a start/stop system and brake energy recuperation, manages an output of 77 kW (105 hp). This TSI engine provides a maximum torque of 175 Nm at between 1,400 and 4,000 rpm.

1.4 R4 16v TSI/TFSI
Based on the EA111, this new engine was announced at the 2005 Frankfurt Motor Show, to be first used in the Mk5 Golf GT, the 125 kW 1.4-litre TSI engine is a "Twincharger", and uses both a turbocharger and a supercharger. Its displacement downsizing leads to improved fuel economy, with 14% more power than the 2.0 FSI, but consuming 5% less fuel. The mechanical supercharger compressor, driven at 5 times the speed of the crankshaft, mainly operates at low engine speeds from idle up to 2,400 revolutions per minute (rpm) to increase low-end torque. The turbocharger assumes full effectiveness at middle revs, and the engine map disengages the clutch-controlled supercharger at a maximum upper limit of 3,500 rpm; the supercharger will then be bypassed once the turbocharger spools up and reaches sufficient speed to provide adequate boost in the upper rev-ranges. This engine is made at Volkswagen-Motorenfertigung, Chemnitz.

In 2007, Volkswagen announced the 90 kW model which will replace the 1.6 FSI  engine. This engine differs from the 103 kW and 125 kW models in several ways. It uses only one method of forced induction – a turbocharger (and not a supercharger), and has water-cooled intercooler. The engine has reduced frictional losses, optimised camshafts, new intake ports, and new high-pressure injector valves. It is also  lighter than the 125 kW model, in order to improve fuel economy and reduce emissions.

identification parts code prefix: 03C, ID codes: BLG, BMY, CAXC
engine displacement & engine configuration  inline-four engine (R4/I4); bore x stroke: , stroke ratio: 1.01:1 – 'square engine', 347.5 cc per cylinder,  peak pressures, compression ratio: 10.0:1
cylinder block & crankcase grey cast iron;  cylinder spacing, five main bearings, die-forged steel crankshaft, roller chain-driven oil pump
cylinder head & valvetrain cast aluminium alloy; four valves per cylinder, 16 valves total, low-friction roller finger cam followers with automatic hydraulic valve clearance compensation, roller chain driven double overhead camshaft (DOHC), continuous adjusting variable intake valve timing
aspiration hot-film air mass meter, cast alloy throttle body with electronically controlled Bosch "E-Gas" throttle valve
90 to 96 kW variants — two-part plastic intake manifold, turbocharger incorporated in exhaust manifold with maximum boost pressure , water-cooled intercooler integrated into intake manifold
103 to 125 kW variants — multi-ribbed belt-driven fifth-generation Eaton Roots-type positive displacement supercharger operated by a magnetic clutch integrated in a module inside the water pump, internal step-down ratio on the input end of the synchronisation gear pair, and KKK turbocharger with integrated wastegate connected in series, administrated by a control flap,  pressure at 1,500 rpm, front-mounted intercooler (FMIC)
fuel system fully demand-controlled and returnless; – fuel tank–mounted low-pressure fuel pump; Fuel Stratified Injection (FSI): camshaft-driven single-piston high-pressure injection pump supplying up to  fuel pressure in common rail fuel rail integrated into the inlet manifold, four combustion chamber sited direct injection sequential solenoid-controlled six-hole fuel injectors, mounted on the intake side between the intake port and cylinder head , homogeneous mixing, stratified lean-burn operation with excess air at part load,
90 to 103 kW variants — 95 RON ultra-low sulphur unleaded petrol (ULSP)
110 to 125 kW variants — 98 RON 'Super Unleaded' ultra-low sulphur unleaded petrol (ULSP) – 95 RON may be used, but will result in lower power output
ignition system & engine management centrally positioned NGK longlife spark plugs, mapped direct ignition with four individual direct-acting single spark coils; Bosch Motronic ME electronic engine control unit (ECU), knock control via a single knock sensor, permanent lambda control
exhaust system cast iron exhaust manifold (with integrated turbocharger), one catalytic converter, two heated oxygen sensors monitoring pre- and post catalyst exhaust gases
DIN-rated motive power & torque outputs, ID codes
;  at 1,500–4,000 rpm — Passat (2009 on)
;  at 1,500–3,500 rpm — CAXA; Golf Mk5 (2007 on), Tiguan (08/10->), Škoda Octavia Mk2, Scirocco Mk3, Audi A1, Audi A3 Mk3
;  at 1,500–4,000 rpm — CAXC; Audi A3, SEAT Leon
;  at 1,750–3,500 rpm — CFBA; Golf Mk6, VW Jetta V, Passat B6, Škoda Octavia Mk2, LAVIDA(SAIC-VW), Bora
;  — BMY; Touran from early 2006, Golf Mk5, Jetta
 at 5,800 rpm;  at 1,250–4,500 rpm — CAVF/CTHF; SEAT Ibiza FR
 at 5,800 rpm;  at 1,750–4,000 rpm — BWK/CAVA; VW Tiguan; VW Sharan Mk2
 at 5,800 rpm;  at 1,750–4,000 rpm — CDGA; Touran, Passat B7 EcoFuel
 at 5,800 rpm;  at 1,750–4,500 rpm — CAVD; Golf Mk5, Golf Mk6, Tiguan, Scirocco Mk3, VW Jetta TSI Sport
 at 5,800 rpm;  at 1,750–4,500 rpm — CTHD; (Updated CAVD for 2013 Models)
 at 6,000 rpm;  (MEP 21.7 bar) at 1,750–4,500 rpm ( at 1,250–6,000 rpm), rev limit: 7,000 rpm — BLG; Golf Mk5 GT, Jetta, Golf Plus, Touran
 at 6,200 rpm;  at 2,000 – 4,500 rpm — CAVE/CTHE; SEAT Ibiza Cupra, Polo GTI, Fabia RS
 at 6,200 rpm;  at 2,000 – 4,500 rpm — CAVG/CTHG; Audi A1
applications 2005 VW Golf Mk5, 2006 VW Touran, 2008 Audi A3, 2008 VW Scirocco, possibly in the 2008 VW Concept R, 2007 SEAT León, 2008 Škoda Octavia, 2009 VW Tiguan, 2009 VW Golf Mk6
references

Awards

Was winner of the "Best New Engine" category in the 2006 annual competition for International Engine of the Year.
Was winner of the "1.0-litre 1.4-litre" category for six consecutive years in the 2006, 2007, 2008, 2009, 2010 and 2011 annual competition for International Engine of the Year.
Was winner of the "Green Engine of the Year" category in the 2009 annual competition for International Engine of the Year.
Was outright overall winner of the 2009 and 2010 International Engine of the Year annual competition.

1.4 TSI (EA211)
For 2012, these newly developed generation of modern petrol engines are manufactured at the Škoda Auto plant in Mladá Boleslav.
identificationparts code prefix: 04E
description1.4 TFSI Green tec engine with 110 kW (140 hp). This engine achieves its maximum torque of 250 Nm at 1,500 to 3,500 rpm.
In North American market it is referred to as CZTA type engine (150 hp).
In Chilean market it is referred to as CHPA type engine (140 hp) or CZDA type engine (150 hp).

New lightweight aluminum construction, an integrated (into the head) exhaust manifold, and a toothed-belt drive for its double overhead
camshaft valvetrain that incorporates variable intake and exhaust timing. The only aspect to be carried over from the EA111 engine that
preceded it is the 82 mm cylinder spacing. The cylinder bore was decreased by 2 mm (to 74.5mm) while the stroke was increased to 80mm, a
change which helps compactness, increases torque, and is ideal for adding boost.

DIN-rated motive power & torque outputs, ID codes
 at 5,000 rpm;  at 1,500-4,000 rpm — CMBA, CPVA
 at 5,000 rpm;  at 1,500-4,000 rpm — CZCA, CPVB
 at 5,000 rpm;  at 1,500-4,000 rpm — CHPA, CPTA (CPTA engine is a CHPA engine with automatic #2 and #3 cylinders deactivation system known as ACT - Active Cylinder Technology)
 at 5,000 rpm;  at 1,500-4,000 rpm — CZDA, CZEA, CZTA

1.5 TSI (EA211 Evo)
identificationparts code prefix: 05E
description1.5 TFSI Green tece engine

DIN-rated motive power & torque outputs, ID codes
 at 5,000 rpm;  at 1,400-3,500 rpm — DACA
 at 5,000 rpm;  at 1,500-3,500 rpm — DADA, DPCA

1.6 R4 16v
identification parts code prefix: 036
engine displacement & engine configuration  inline-four engine (R4/I4); bore x stroke: , stroke ratio: 0.88:1 – undersquare/long-stroke, 399.4 cc per cylinder, compression ratio: 10.5:1 (China), 11.5:1 (ATN, AUS, AZD, BCB), 12.1:1 (AUS)
cylinder block & crankcase grey cast iron; five main bearings, die-forged steel crankshaft
cylinder head & valvetrain cast aluminium alloy; four valves per cylinder, 16 valves total, double overhead camshaft (DOHC)
fuel system & engine management
 electronic multipoint injection; Bosch MD 7; Magneti Marelli 4MV (ATN, AUS), 4LV (AZD, BCB), 7GV
 electronic injection Total Flex gasoline or ethanol (Brazil)
DIN-rated motive power & torque outputs, ID codes
 at 5,700 rpm;  at 4,500 rpm — AUS, AZD, ATN, BCB (discontinued)
 at 5,600 rpm;  at 3,800 rpm — BTS, CFNA, CLSA
 at 5,200 rpm;  at 3,750 rpm — CFNB
 at 5,800 rpm;  at 4,200 rpm — (China)
applications SEAT Ibiza Mk3, Mk4 & Mk5, SEAT Córdoba Mk2, SEAT León Mk1, SEAT Toledo Mk2, Mk4, Škoda Fabia Mk2, Škoda Rapid, Škoda Roomster (BTS: 05/06->), Škoda Octavia, Volkswagen Polo Mk4, Volkswagen Golf Mk4, Volkswagen Bora, VW Jetta Mk4 (China), Volkswagen Polo sedan

1.8 R4
identificationparts code prefix: ???, ID code: ADF
engine displacement & engine configuration  inline-four engine (R4/I4); bore x stroke: , stroke ratio: 0.94:1 – undersquare/long-stroke, 445.2 cc per cylinder, compression ratio: 9.0:1
cylinder block & crankcase grey cast iron; five main bearings, die-forged steel crankshaft
cylinder head & valvetrain cast aluminium alloy; two valves per cylinder, 8 valves total, hydraulic bucket tappets, timing belt-driven single overhead camshaft (SOHC)
fuel system Pierburg 1B3 downdraft carburettor
dimensions length: , width , height , dry mass: 
EWG-rated motive power & torque output
 at 4,000 rpm;  at 2,100 rpm
application Volkswagen Industrial Motor (04/94->)
reference

1.8 R4
identificationparts code prefix: ???, ID codes: HT, RD, RV, PB, GZ, GX, PF, FP, ABS, ADZ, ACC
engine displacement & engine configuration  inline-four engine (R4/I4); bore x stroke: , stroke ratio: 0.94:1 – undersquare/long-stroke, 445.2 cc per cylinder, compression ratio: 8.5–10.8:1
cylinder block & crankcase grey cast iron; five main bearings, die-forged steel crankshaft
cylinder head & valvetrain cast aluminium alloy; two valves per cylinder, 8 valves total, single overhead camshaft (SOHC)
fuel system & engine management
 Bosch CIS continuous single-point fuel injection system, with or without knock control and electronic timing advance
 multi-point electronic indirect fuel injection with four intake manifold-sited fuel injectors; Magneti Marelli, Bosch Motronic or Digifant
 electronic injection Total Flex, Gasoline or Ethanol (BR)
DIN-rated motive power & torque outputs, ID codes, applications
 at 5,000 rpm;  at 2,500 rpm — AAM, ANN (discontinued)
 at 5,200 rpm;  at 3,000 rpm — RP (discontinued)
 at 5,500 rpm;  at 2,500 rpm — ABS, ADZ, ANP: VW Gol, VW Golf Mk3, VW Pointer, SEAT Ibiza Mk2
 at 5,400 rpm;  at 3,000 rpm — 1P (discontinued)
 at 5,400 rpm;  at 3,000 rpm — VW Gol, Volkswagen Santana, VW Golf Mk1, VW Golf Mk2, VW Saveiro
applications Audi 80, Audi 100, SEAT Ibiza Mk2, SEAT Córdoba Mk1, SEAT Toledo Mk1, Volkswagen Golf Mk2, Volkswagen Golf Mk3, Volkswagen Golf Mk3 Cabriolet, Volkswagen Golf Mk3 Variant, Volkswagen Vento, Volkswagen Jetta Mk2, Volkswagen Jetta Mk3, Volkswagen Passat B2, Volkswagen Passat B3, Volkswagen Passat B4

1.8 R4 16v
identification parts code prefix: PL, 9A, KR (1.8 & 2.0 versions)
engine displacement & engine configuration  inline-four engine (R4/I4); bore x stroke: , stroke ratio: 0.94:1 – undersquare/long-stroke, 445.2 cc per cylinder, compression ratio: 10.0:1, longitudinally mounted
cylinder block & crankcase grey cast iron; five main bearings, die-forged steel crankshaft
cylinder head & valvetrain cast aluminium alloy; four valves per cylinder, 16 valves total, double overhead camshaft (DOHC)
fuel system & engine management multi-point electronic sequential indirect fuel injection with four intake manifold-sited fuel injectors; Bosch Motronic electronic engine control unit (ECU)
DIN-rated motive power & torque output  at ?,??? rpm;  at ?,??? rpm: SEAT Ibiza GTI

1.8 R4 20vT (EA113/EA827)
Wholly created and developed by AUDI AG, this version is a 1.8-litre 20-valve turbocharged engine built in Wolfsburg, Germany; Győr, Hungary; and Puebla, Mexico. Output varies based on internal component selection, turbocharger, and engine control unit (ECU) software. This ubiquitous power plant has been extensively used in all four mainstream Volkswagen Group marques, along with Volkswagen Industrial Motor applications.

This engine is also used in a very high state of tune in the one-make Formula Palmer Audi (FPA) open-wheeled auto racing series. It develops , with an extra  available from a driver operated 'push-to-pass' turbo boost button. Based entirely on road-car production engines and prepared and built by Mountune Racing, it only differs by utilising a Pi Research Pectel electronic fuel injection and a water-cooled Garrett T34 turbocharger with closed-loop boost control.

Furthermore, an even higher 'step up' version of this engine is used in the later European-based FIA Formula Two Championship. Developed as a pure race engine and again built by Mountune Racing, this variant includes many all-new lightweight components, and has been converted to a dry sump lubrication system.
identification parts code prefix: 058, 06A, 06B
engine displacement & engine configuration  inline-four engine (R4/I4); bore x stroke: , stroke ratio: 0.94:1 – undersquare/long-stroke, 445.2 cc per cylinder, compression ratio: 9.0–9.5:1
cylinder block & crankcase grey cast iron; five main bearings, die-forged steel crankshaft, fracture-split forged steel connecting rods, Mahle forged aluminium alloy pistons
cylinder head & valvetrain cast aluminium alloy; five valves per cylinder, 20 valves total, hydraulic bucket tappets, timing belt-driven double overhead camshaft (DOHC) with variable inlet valve timing
aspiration cast aluminium alloy intake manifold, turbocharger, intercooler
fuel system, ignition system & engine management multi-point electronic sequential indirect fuel injection with four intake manifold-sited fuel injectors; mapped direct ignition with four individual direct-acting single spark coils; Bosch Motronic ME 7.5  (MBE 975F on Industrial variants) electronic engine control unit (ECU), red line: 6,500 rpm, rev limit 6,800 rpm
Mass149 kg ('BAM' engine, dry)
DIN-rated motive power & torque outputs, ID codes, applications
 at 5,800 rpm;  at 1,750–4,600 rpm — AEB, AGU, AJH, APH, ARX, ARZ, ATW, AUM, AWC, AWD, AWL, AWT, AWV, AWW, BJX, BKF, BKV
VW Polo GTI, VW Golf Mk4 GTI, VW Bora, VW New Beetle, VW Passat B5 and VW Sagitar.VW Sharan . Also on the Audi TT Mk1 (8N), Audi A3 (first gen.), Audi A4, Audi A6, Škoda Octavia, Škoda Superb (first gen.) and SEAT Ibiza.
 at 5,700 rpm;  at 1,800 rpm — EU5 rated: CFMA
SEAT Exeo (CFMA: 12/08-on)
 — AQX, AYP
SEAT Ibiza Mk3 Cupra, Cupra R, SEAT Cordoba Cupra
 at 5,700 rpm;  at 1,950–4,700 rpm — BFB, BKB, BVP
replaced the 110 kW version in 2003 on most models; Audi A4, Audi TT
 at 5,900 rpm;  at 1,950–5,000 rpm — AMB, AWM
Audi A4, VW Passat. This version only exists in North American and emerging markets.
 at 5,500 rpm;  at 1,950–5,000 rpm — AJQ, APP, ARY, ATC, AUQ, AWP, BEK, BNU (North America only), AJL, BBU (UK)
Volkswagen Golf Mk4 GTI, VW Bora/Jetta, New Beetle, Audi A3, Audi A4 Quattro Sport, Audi TT Mk1 (8N), Škoda Octavia vRS, SEAT León, SEAT Toledo, VW Polo GTI.
 at 5,700 rpm;  at 1,950–4,700 rpm — BEX, BVR
Audi A4 (BEX: 11/02-12/04), Audi TT Mk1 (8N) (BVR: 09/05-06/06)
;  — APY, AUL, AMK
Audi S3 (8L) (APY: 11/98-08/00, AUL: 09/99-04/01, AMK: 09/00-04/02), SEAT León Mk1 (1M) Cupra R (05/02-05/03)
 at 5,900 rpm;  at 2,200–5,500 rpm — AMU, BEA (North America only), APX, BAM
Audi TT Mk1 (8N), Audi S3 (8L), SEAT León Mk1 (1M) Cupra R (05/03-06/06). This version is built in Győr.
 at 5,700 rpm;  at 2,300–5,000 rpm —
2005 Audi TT quattro Sport, (9:1 compression ratio) — BFV
EWG-rated motive power & torque outputs, applications
 at 6,000 rpm;  at 2,500–5,500 rpm — Volkswagen Industrial Motor, Stage1
 at 6,000 rpm;  at 2,500–5,500 rpm — Volkswagen Industrial Motor, Stage2
 at 6,000 rpm;  at 4,000–5,500 rpm — Volkswagen Industrial Motor, Stage3
references

awards

Was placed in the 1997, 1998, 2001, 2002 and 2003 annual list of Ward's 10 Best Engines

2.0 R4 (EA827)
identificationparts code prefix: ???
engine displacement & engine configuration  inline-four engine (R4/I4); bore x stroke: , stroke ratio: 0.89:1 – undersquare/long-stroke, 496.1 cc per cylinder, compression ratio: 10.0–10.5:1
cylinder block & crankcase CG25 grey cast iron; five main bearings; die-forged steel crankshaft, forged steel connecting rods
cylinder head & valvetrain cast aluminium alloy; two valves per cylinder, 8 valves total, hydraulic bucket tappets, timing belt-driven one-piece cast single overhead camshaft (SOHC)
aspiration cast aluminium alloy intake manifold
engine management Bosch Motronic or Siemens Simos electronic engine control unit (ECU)
EWG-rated motive power & torque outputs, application, ID codes
 at 2,800 rpm;  at 2,100–2,400 rpm — Volkswagen Industrial Motor multi-fuel (petrol / LPG / CNG) – CBS (08/06->)
 at 2,800 rpm;  at 2,100–2,400 rpm — Volkswagen Industrial Motor multi-fuel (petrol / LPG / CNG) – BEF (04/02->)
DIN-rated motive power & torque outputs, ID codes
 at 5,400 rpm;  at 3,500 rpm — Ecofuel (bivalent) at 2,600 rpm — ATM
 at 5,400 rpm;  at 3,200 rpm — AZH, AZJ
 at 5,400 rpm;  at 3,500 rpm — AZM
 at 5,200 rpm;  at 2,700-4,700 rpm — AXA
 at 5,600 rpm;  at 2,400 rpm — ATF
 at 5,600 rpm;  at 2,600 rpm — AUZ, ASU, AVA
applications SEAT Ibiza Mk2 & Mk3, SEAT Córdoba, SEAT Toledo Mk1, SEAT Alhambra, Škoda Fabia Mk1 (6Y), Škoda Octavia Mk1 (1U), Škoda Superb Mk1 (3U), Volkswagen Santana, Volkswagen Polo Mk4, Volkswagen Golf Mk3, Volkswagen Golf Mk4, Volkswagen Vento, Volkswagen Bora, Volkswagen Jetta, Volkswagen New Beetle, VW Passat B3, VW Passat B4, VW Passat B5, Volkswagen Transporter (T5), Volkswagen Industrial Motor
reference

2.0 R4 16v "Turbo FSI"/TSI/TFSI (EA113)
This turbocharged EA113 engine is based on the naturally aspirated 110kW 2.0 FSI.
identification parts code prefix/variant: 06F.C, 06F.D
engine displacement & engine configuration  inline-four engine (R4/I4); bore x stroke: , stroke ratio: 0.89:1 – undersquare/long-stroke, 496.1 cc per cylinder, compression ratio: 10.5:1
cylinder block & crankcase CG25 grey cast iron with liquid-blasted cylinder bore honing;  cylinder spacing, five main bearings, die-forged steel crankshaft, two simplex-roller chain driven balance shafts
cylinder head & valvetrain cast aluminium alloy; modified inlet duct geometry for high tumble values providing superior knock resistance, four valves per cylinder (exhaust valves sodium filled for increased cooling), 16 valves total, low-friction roller finger cam followers with automatic hydraulic valve clearance compensation, belt and roller-chain driven double overhead camshaft (DOHC), continuous intake camshaft adjustment (42° variance from crankshaft)
aspiration hot-film air mass meter incorporated into air filter housing, cast alloy throttle body with electronically controlled throttle valve, plastic variable length controlled intake manifold with charge movement flaps adjusted by a continuous-action pilot motor,  boost water-cooled BorgWarner K03 turbocharger (K04 on 169 kW upwards) incorporated in exhaust manifold, sandwiched central front-mounted intercooler (FMIC)
ignition system & engine management centrally positioned Bosch longlife spark plugs, mapped direct ignition with four individual direct-acting single spark coils; Bosch Motronic MED 9.1 electronic engine control unit (ECU), cylinder-selective knock control via two knock sensors, permanent lambda control
exhaust system Cast iron exhaust manifold (with integrated BorgWarner turbocharger), one primary and one main ceramic catalytic converters, two heated oxygen sensors monitoring pre- and post catalyst exhaust gases
dimensions length: , width: , height: , mass: 
DIN-rated motive power & torque outputs, ID codes & applications
  at 4,300 rpm;  at 1,800–4,200 rpm — BPJ — Audi A6 (C6), VW Tiguan
  at 6,000 rpm;  at 1,800–5,000 rpm — BWA — 2005 SEAT León
  at 5,100–6,000 rpm;  at 1,700–5,000 rpm — AXX, BWA, BWE, BPY (North America) — Audi A4 (B7), Audi A3 (8P), 2006 Audi TT, VW Passat (B6), VW Golf Mk5 GTI, VW Jetta Mk5 GLI, SEAT León FR Mk2, SEAT Altea, SEAT Toledo Mk3, SEAT Exeo, Škoda Octavia (1Z) vRS

  at 5,900 rpm;  at 2,200–4,800 rpm — BUL — 2005 Audi A4 (B7) DTM Edition, Audi A4 (B7) Special Edition
  at 4,500–6,300 rpm;  at 2,500–4,400 rpm — CDL — Volkswagen Polo R WRC
  at 4,200–6,000 rpm;  at 1,450–4,200 rpm — CDL — Audi A5 (B9; 40 TFSI)
  at 5,500 rpm;  at 2,250–5,200 rpm — BYD — VW Golf Mk5 GTI Edition 30, Pirelli Edition
  at 5,500 rpm;  at 2,200–5,200 rpm — CDL — Volkswagen Golf MKVI GTI Edition 35
  at 6,000 rpm;  at 2,200–5,500 rpm — BWJ — SEAT León Cupra, SEAT León Cupra Mk2 facelift
  at 5,000–6,000 rpm;  at 1,600–4,500 rpm — CDLA — Audi A5 (B9; 45 TFSI)
  at 6,000 rpm;  at 2,400–5,200 rpm — CDL — Audi S3 (8P), Golf R (Australia, Japan, Middle-East and North America)
  at 6,000 rpm;  at 2,500–5,000 rpm — BHZ — Audi S3 (8P)
  at 6,000 rpm;  at 2,500–5,000 rpm — CDL — Scirocco R
  at 6,000 rpm;  at 2,300–5,200 rpm — CDLA — Audi S3 (8P), Audi TTS, SEAT León Cupra R Mk2 facelift, VW Scirocco R
  at 6,000 rpm;  at 2,500–5,000 rpm — CDLF — Golf R (Europe)
  at 6,000 rpm;  at 2,500–5,000 rpm — CDLB — Audi TTS (Europe), VW Arteon (North America)
notes the 162 kW (only Polo R WRC) and higher versions have stronger pistons and gudgeon pins, new rings, reinforced connecting rods, new bearings, reinforced cylinder block at the main bearing pedestals and cap, new lightweight aluminium-silicon alloy cylinder head for high temperature resistance and strength, adjusted exhaust camshaft timing, increased cross-section high-pressure injectors,  (value only valid for Audi S3(8P)) boost pressure K04 turbocharger with larger turbine and compression rotor (S3, Cupra, GTI Edition 30), of which some components are NOT shared with the lower output variants
references

awards

Was winner of the "1.8-litre 2.0-litre" category for four consecutive years in the 2005, 2006, 2007 and 2008 annual competition for International Engine of the Year,
Was placed for four consecutive years in the 2006, 2007, 2008 and 2009 annual list of Ward's 10 Best Engines

Four-cylinder EA888 petrols

This latest EA888 family of straight-four 16-valve internal combustion engines with variable valve timing is anticipated to be an eventual complete replacement of the EA113 range. It was wholly designed and developed by VAG AG. The only common feature with its predecessors is the sharing of the same  cylinder spacing – which keeps the engine length relatively short, meaning it can be installed either transversely or longitudinally, though engineers have said that it is an evolution of the earlier EA827/113 designs due to cost concerns. Grey cast iron (GJL 250) remains the choice material for the cylinder block and crankcase, due to its inherent good acoustic dampening properties. This all-new EA888 range is notable for utilising simplex roller chains to drive the two overhead camshafts, instead of the former engines' toothed-rubber timing belt. Like the final developments of the former EA113 engine generation, all EA888s only use the VAG AG/Bosch Fuel Stratified Injection (FSI) direct injection. Furthermore, EA888 engines are also able to utilise the corporate 'valvelift' technology, which complements the existing variable valve timing. This new family of engines is scheduled to be universally available for all markets on five continents, within all marques of the Volkswagen Group. The closely related EA113 range still remains in production.

Grainger & Worrall was reported to have cast 50 CGI cylinder blocks for over 12 months as of October 2013, based on the EA888 gasoline engine.

1.8 R4 16v TSI/TFSI (EA888)
identification parts code prefix: 06H, 06J; ID codes: BYT
engine displacement & engine configuration  EA888 inline-four engine (R4/I4); bore x stroke: , stroke ratio: 0.98:1 – 'square engine', 449.6 cc per cylinder; compression ratio: 9.6:1,  cylinder spacing
cylinder head & valvetrain cast aluminium alloy; four valves per cylinder, 16 valves total, low-friction roller finger cam followers with automatic hydraulic valve clearance compensation, toothed chain-driven double overhead camshaft (DOHC), continuous vane-adjustable variable intake valve timing
aspiration hot-film air mass meter, cast alloy throttle body with electronically controlled Bosch E-Gas throttle valve, plastic variable length controlled intake manifold with charge movement flaps controlling combustion chamber air movement, BorgWarner K03 water-cooled turbocharger incorporated into cast iron exhaust manifold, sandwiched central front-mounted intercooler (FMIC)
fuel system fully demand-controlled and returnless; – fuel tank–mounted low-pressure fuel pump; Fuel Stratified Injection (FSI): single-piston high-pressure injection pump driven by a four-lobe cam on the exhaust camshaft supplying up to  fuel pressure in the stainless steel common rail fuel rail, four combustion chamber sited direct injection sequential solenoid-controlled six-hole fuel injectors, air-guided combustion process, multi-pulse dual-stage injection during the induction and compression stroke with homogeneous mixing, stratified lean-burn operation with excess air at part load, 95 RON unleaded ultra-low sulphur petrol
ignition system & engine management centrally positioned longlife spark plugs, mapped direct ignition with four individual direct-acting single spark coils; Bosch Motronic MED electronic engine control unit (ECU), cylinder-selective knock control via two knock sensors, permanent lambda control
exhaust system cast iron exhaust manifold (with integrated turbocharger), close-coupled and main catalytic converters – both ceramic
DIN-rated motive power & torque outputs, ID codes
 at 4,000–6,200 rpm;  at 1,500–3,650rpm — longitudinal — Audi A4 (B8), SEAT Exeo
 at 4,500–6,200 rpm;  at 1,500–4,500 rpm,  from 1,000 rpm — transversal — CDAA Škoda Yeti, SEAT Leon Mk2 (1P)
 at 4,300–6,200 rpm;  at 1,500–4,200 rpm,  from 1,000 rpm — transversal — CDAB Škoda Yeti
 at 4,500–6,200 rpm;  at 1,500–4,500 rpm — longitudinal — Audi A4 (B8), Audi A3 Mk2 (8P), Audi TT Mk2 (8J), SEAT Exeo — CDHB Audi A4 (B8)
 at 4,800–6,200 rpm;  at 1,750–4,750 rpm — transverse — VW USA-Passat B7 (NMS) — CPKA, CPRA (born 2014)
 at 4,800–6,200 rpm;  at 1,500–4,800 rpm — longitudinal — Audi A5
 at 3,800–6,200 rpm;  at 1,400–3,700 rpm — longitudinal — Audi A4 (B8) (2012–), Audi A5 — CJEB
 at 5,100–6,200 rpm;  at 1,250–5,000 rpm — transverse — Audi TT (FV/8S) (2014–) — CJSA (EA888-Gen3)
applications Audi TT Mk2 (8J), Audi 8P A3, Audi B7 A4, Audi A4 (B8), Audi A5, SEAT Leon Mk2 (1P), SEAT Altea XL, Škoda Yeti, Škoda Octavia Mk3 (5E), Škoda Superb Mk3 (3V), VW Jetta Mk5/Sagitar, VW Passat B8, VW Passat CC
references of the German technical engine publication mtz, press release 11/2006: "Der neue Audi 1.8 TFSI-Motor"Owners Manual, Passat, U.S. Edition, Model Year 2015. p. 44.

2.0 R4 16v TSI/TFSI (EA888)
Manufacturing commenced March 2008.
identification parts code prefix: 06H, 06J; ID codes: CAEA, CAEB, CAWA, CAWB, CBFA, CCTA, CCTB, CCZA, CCZB, CCZC, CCZD, CDNB, CDNC, CHHA, CHHB, CJXA, CJXB, CJXC, CJXD, CJXE, CJXF, CJXG, CYFB, DKFA
engine displacement & engine configuration  EA888 inline-four engine (R4/I4); bore x stroke: , stroke ratio: 0.89:1 – undersquare/long-stroke, 496.1 cc per cylinder; compression ratio: 9.6:1 (10.3:1 A3 Cabrio 2009),  cylinder spacing
The water pump bolts to the side of the block, under the intake manifold, and is driven by a toothed belt and a pulley on the back of the intake-side balance shaft.
cylinder head & valvetrain cast aluminium alloy; four valves per cylinder, 16 valves total, low-friction roller finger cam followers with automatic hydraulic valve clearance compensation, toothed chain-driven double overhead camshaft (DOHC), continuous vane-adjustable variable intake valve timing, Audi variants have two-stage "valvelift" inlet valve lift variable control
aspiration hot-film air mass meter, cast alloy throttle body with electronically controlled Bosch E-Gas throttle valve, plastic variable length controlled intake manifold with charge movement flaps controlling combustion chamber air movement, IHI water-cooled turbocharger incorporated in exhaust manifold, sandwiched central front-mounted intercooler (FMIC)
fuel system fully demand-controlled and returnless; – fuel tank–mounted low-pressure fuel pump; Fuel Stratified Injection (FSI): single-piston high-pressure injection pump driven by a four-lobe cam on the exhaust camshaft supplying up to  fuel pressure in the stainless steel common rail fuel rail, four combustion chamber sited direct injection sequential solenoid-controlled six-hole fuel injectors, air-guided combustion process, multi-pulse dual-stage injection during the induction and compression stroke with homogeneous mixing, stratified lean-burn operation with excess air at part load, 95 RON ultra-low sulphur unleaded petrol
ignition system & engine management centrally positioned longlife spark plugs, mapped direct ignition with four individual direct-acting single spark coils; Bosch Motronic MED 17 electronic engine control unit (ECU), cylinder-selective knock control via two knock sensors, permanent lambda control
exhaust system cast iron exhaust manifold (with integrated turbocharger), close-coupled and main catalytic converters – both ceramic
DIN-rated motive power & torque outputs and applications – Non-valvelift variants
 at 4,300–6,000 rpm;  at 1,700–5,000 rpm — CAWA: VW Tiguan
 at 4,300–6,200 rpm;  at 1,700–4,200 rpm — CCZC: Audi Q3, engine is installed transversely, VW Tiguan
 at 4,500–6,200 rpm;  at 1,700–4,500 rpm — CCZD: VW Tiguan
 at 5,100–6,000 rpm;  at 1,800–5,000 rpm — CCTA/CBFA: 2009 VW Golf Mk5 GTI (US only), VW Golf Mk6 GTI (US only), Audi Q3 (US Only), VW Jetta Mk5, VW Jetta Mk6, VW Passat B6, VW CC, Audi A3 (8P)
 at 5,100–6,000 rpm;  at 1,700–5,000 rpm — CAWB: Audi A3 Cabriolet, VW Scirocco, VW Tiguan, CCZA: Audi TT, Škoda Superb Mk2 (3T), Škoda Octavia
 at 5,000–6,000 rpm;  at 1,800–5,000 rpm — CGMA: China market only; VW Golf Mk6 GTI, VW Tiguan, VW Magotan (Passat)
 at 5,000–6,200 rpm;  at 1,800–4,900 rpm — CPSA: Audi Q3, engine is installed transversely
 at 5,300–6,200 rpm;  at 1,700–5,200 rpm — CCZB: VW Golf Mk6 GTI, has larger front-mounted intercooler as found in 2010+ Audi S3/VW Mk6 Golf R CDL EA113, VW Scirocco, VW Passat, VW CC, VW Tiguan, SEAT Altea Freetrack, SEAT Leon FR 
DIN-rated motive power & torque outputs and applications – EA888 evo2 and EA888 Gen3 with Valvelift at exhaust side.
 at 4,200–6,000 rpm;  at 1,500–4,000 rpm — CAEA/CDNB: Audi A4 (B8), Audi Q5, Škoda Kodiaq
 at 4,300–6,000 rpm;  at 1,500–4,200 rpm — CAEA/CAEB/CDNC: Audi A4 (B8), Audi A5, Audi Q5, SEAT Exeo
 at 4,300–6,000 rpm;  at 1,600–4,200 rpm — CESA: Audi TT Mk2 (8J), engine is installed transversely
 at 4,500–6,200 rpm;  at 1,500–4,400 rpm — CHHB: Audi A3, Skoda Superb, VW Golf Mk7 GTI, Škoda Octavia RS, VW Tiguan CULC: VW Scirocco GTS
 at 4,500–6,250 rpm;  at 1,500–4,500 rpm — CNCD: Porsche Macan, Audi Q5, Audi A4 (B8)
 at 4,500–6,250 rpm;  at 1,500–4,500 rpm — CUHA: China 5 emission standard Volkswagen Phideon, Audi A6L C7
 at 4,500–6,250 rpm;  at 1,650–4,500 rpm — DMJA: China 6b(PN 11 without RDE) emission standard, Volkswagen Phideon
165 kW (224 PS; 221 bhp) at 4,500–6,250 rpm;  at 1,650–4,500 rpm — DKWB: China 6b(PN 11 without RDE) emission standard, Audi A6L C8, Audi Q5L
 at 4,700–6,200 rpm;  at 1,500–4,600 rpm — CHHA/DKFA: VW Golf Mk7 GTI Performance, Škoda Octavia RS230, VW Jetta Mk7 GLI
 at 4,700–6,200 rpm;  at 1,600–4,300 rpm — DLBA: Škoda Octavia RS245, VW Tiguan
185 kW (224 PS; 221 bhp) at 4,500–6,250 rpm;  at 1,500–4,500 rpm — DKWA: China 6b(PN 11 without RDE) emission standard, Audi A4L, Audi Q5L
 at 5,350–6,600 rpm;  at 1,750–5,300 rpm — CJXE: Volkswagen Golf MK7 GTI Clubsport, SEAT Leon Cupra
 at 5,100–6,500 rpm;  at 1,800–5,500 rpm — CJXA/CJXB: SEAT Leon Cupra, Skoda Superb. (Audi S3 and VW Golf Mk7 R in some foreign markets)
 at 5,900–6,400 rpm;  at 1,700–5,800 rpm — CJXD: SEAT Leon Cupra
 at 5,400 rpm;  at 1,800 rpm — CYFB: VW Golf Mk7 R, Audi S3 in North America (lacks MPI)
 at 5,500–6,200 rpm;  at 1,800–5,500 rpm — CJXC/CJXA: Audi S3, VW Golf Mk7 R (Europe), SEAT Leon Cupra
;  — CJXG: Audi TTS, VW Golf Mk7 R, SEAT Leon Cupra R
235 kW (320 PS; 316 bhp; 420 N⋅m (310 lbf⋅ft) — Evo4 - Golf Mk8 R
DIN-rated motive power & torque outputs and applications – EA888 Gen3 with Valvelift at intake side known as EA888 Gen3 Bz.
 at 4,100–6,000 rpm;  at 1,600–4,000 rpm — DBFA: China 5 emission standard, Volkswagen Magotan
 at 4,100–6,000 rpm;  at 1,500–4,000 rpm — DKVA: China 6b(without PN 11) emission standard, Volkswagen Magotan
 at 4,100–6,000 rpm;  at 1,500–4,000 rpm — DPLA: China 6b(PN 11 without RDE) emission standard, Volkswagen Magotan
 at 4,200–6,000 rpm;  at 1,450–4,200 rpm — CWNA: China 5 emission standard Audi A4L
 at 4,200–6,000 rpm;  at 1,450–4,200 rpm — DKUA: China 6b(without PN 11) emission standard Audi A4L
 at 4,200–6,000 rpm;  at 1,450–4,200 rpm — DTAA: China 6b(PN 11 without RDE) emission standard Audi A4L
reference
:

awards

Winner of the "1.8-litre 2.0-litre" category in the 2009 annual competition for International Engine of the Year.

Known problems 
The Generation 1 EA888 suffered from higher than usual / favorable engine oil consumption in both 1.8 and 2.0 litre forms. Mainly affecting the Longitudinal Audi applications between 2008 and 2012 (most commonly the 8K / B8 A4 8T / 8F B8 A5 & 8R Q5). In rare occurrences it affects the Transverse applications in the 8P Audi A3, 8J Audi TT and in even rarer occasions would affect the MK6 Volkswagen Golf GTI and lower powered Sciroccos etc. that were not fitted with the EA113 family of engines. In even more extreme cases it would affect the Generation 3 from 2016 to present day. The rectification for this is performed after a two part oil consumption test is carried out by a main dealer, The vehicle will need to be burning more than approximately a metric litre per 1,000 KM or 600 miles, or if the top up oil warning illuminates on the instrument cluster. Only after this test is carried out and an agreement of payment by the manufacturer & customer contribution is agreed the repair can be carried out only by main dealers and manufacturer approved repairers. The rectification that is carried out is to remove the engine, replace the Piston & Connecting Rod assemblies in all four cylinders with modified units, head gasket and so forth. From late 2012, the modified internal engine components were fitted to new replacement engines and new vehicle units by the Volkswagen group engine plants.

Another common issue is camshaft timing chain tensioner failure, again in earlier generation 1 models. This was due to the design of the retaining element that after higher mileages and / or premature wear stopped the tensioner from holding the tension in the timing chain. If in the case of this component 
failing, the chain would jump, allowing the pistons and valves to potentially hit each other, causing expensive and possibly terminal engine damage. Along with the earlier mentioned oil consumption issues, this was eventually addressed by the Volkswagen Group engine plants, Who fitted a modified (internally known as Version 2) tensioner that is retained by a much more reliable spring retainer instead.

The final mainstream common issue affects all EA888 generations. The cooling system is mainly a problem free system, with the exception of the plastic thermostat unit, these are very commonly known to be prone to leaks, with no specific part of the housing known to leak. On the EA888, the thermostat unit also includes the coolant pump, on the Generation 2 & 3 the coolant pump is still part of the thermostat, however is available separately. The coolant pump / thermostat unit is located under the intake manifold regardless of generation, model year or application. The thermostat side is joined by a plastic union directly to the engine oil cooler, which in turn is mounted to and is an integral part of the ancillary / alternator bracket (also includes the oil filter housing in all generations and applications). The coolant pump is driven by the intake side balance shaft, on the flywheel side of the engine. The rectification is to renew the thermostat unit with a modified unit, and if needed in later models, the coolant pump if necessary. However these newer units are still known to leak. There have currently been no further modifications to the design of this to combat the issues by Volkswagen Group.

Turbo 
The MQB platform suffers from early turbocharger failure. This affects models like the Audi S3, Golf 7 R/GTI and the Seat Cupra models. More so: models built prior to 2015 are more prone to failure. This can be caused because there is shaft play due to an imbalanced input shaft which can cause the turbine to collide with the teflon coating of the turbocharger, or because of the manifold sealing surface.

List of turbos 
IHI IS20 - Transverse - Mid output engines, like 2.0T A3

 06K	145	702	K
 06K	145	702	Q
 06K	145	702	R
 06K	145	702	T
 06K	145	722	G
 06K	145	722	K
 06K	145	722	L
IHI IS20 - Longitudinal - Mid output engines, like 2.0T A4
 06L	145	702
 06L	145	702	D
 06L	145	702	F
 06L	145	702	M
 06L	145	702	P
 06L	145	702	Q
 06L	145	702	R
 06L	145	722	B
 06L	145	722	C
 06L	145	722	D
 06L	145	722	E
 06L	145	722	F
 06L	145	722	G
 06L	145	722	L
 06L	145	722	M
IHI IS38 - Transverse - High output engine, like 2.0T S3, Golf R
 06K	145	702	J
 06K	145	702	M
 06K	145	702	N
 06K	145	722	A
 06K	145	722	H
 06K	145	722	N
 06K	145	722	P
 06K	145	722	S
 06K	145	722	T
 06K 145 874 F
 06K 145 874 N

===== Waterpump/thermostat

Five-cylinder petrols

2.5 R5 20v TFSI [Audi TTRS, RS3, RSQ3 & quattro Concept] (EA855 and EA855 evo)
An all-new engine designed by AUDI AGs high-performance subsidiary Audi Sport GmbH (formerly quattro GmbH), harking back to the original turbocharged five cylinder Audi engines in the "Ur-" Audi Quattro of the 1980s. A world first for a petrol engine, its cylinder block is constructed from compacted vermicular graphite cast iron (GJV/CGI) – first used in Audi's large displacement, high-performance Turbocharged Direct Injection (TDI) diesel engines.
identification parts code prefix/variant: 07K3; ID code: CEPA, CEPB, CTSA, CZGA, CZGB, DAZA, DNWA
engine displacement & engine configuration  inline five engine (R5/I5); bore x stroke: , stroke ratio: 0.89:1 – undersquare/long-stroke, 496.1 cc per cylinder;  cylinder spacing, 144 degree firing interval, firing order: 1-2-4-5-3, compression ratio: 10.0:1
cylinder block & crankcase GJV-450 compacted vermicular graphite cast iron (GJV/CGI); six main bearings, two-part cast aluminium alloy horizontal-baffled oil sump, simplex roller chain-driven oil pump, die-forged steel crankshaft, forged steel connecting rods, cast aluminium alloy pistons (weight, each, including rings and gudgeon pin)
cylinder head & valvetrain cast high hot-strength aluminium alloy, modified inlet duct geometry for high tumble values providing superior knock resistance, four valves per cylinder (exhaust valves sodium filled for increased cooling), 20 valves total, low-friction roller finger cam followers with automatic hydraulic valve clearance compensation, simplex roller chain-driven (relay method) lightweight double overhead camshafts (DOHC), variable valve timing with continuous adjusting intake and exhaust camshaft timing of up to 42 degrees from the crankshaft, two-stage 'valvelift' variable lift control for inlet valves, siamesed inlet ports, Audi "RS" 'red' plastic cam cover
aspiration twin charge pressure sensors; one pre-throttle plate, one intake manifold mounted, no air flow meter, cast alloy throttle body with electronically controlled throttle valve, two piece intake manifold with charge movement flaps adjusted by a continuous-action pilot motor, water-cooled turbocharger incorporated in exhaust manifold with  diameter outlet, generating up to  boost, separated central lower front-mounted intercooler (FMIC)
fuel system fully demand-controlled and returnless: fuel tank-mounted low-pressure fuel lift pump; Fuel Stratified Injection (FSI): single-piston high-pressure injection pump supplying up to  fuel pressure in the stainless steel common rail fuel rail, five combustion chamber sited direct injection sequential solenoid-controlled fuel injectors, air-guided combustion process, multi-pulse injection with homogeneous mixing, stratified lean-burn operation with excess air at part load, ultra-low sulfur unleaded petrol (ULSP)
ignition system & engine management Beru longlife spark plugs centrally positioned in combustion chamber, mapped direct ignition with five individual direct-acting single spark coils; Bosch Motronic MED electronic engine control unit (ECU), cylinder-selective knock control via two knock sensors, permanent lambda control
exhaust system secondary air injection pump for direct injection into exhaust ports to assist cold start operation, cast iron exhaust manifold (with integrated turbocharger), one primary and two secondary high-flow sports catalytic converters, two heated oxygen sensors monitoring pre- and post-primary catalyst exhaust gases (secondary catalysts unmonitored), vacuum-operated map-controlled flap-valve mounted in one rear exhaust silencer tail pipe
dimensions length: , mass: 
applicationAudi quattro concept (2010), Audi RS3 (2010–2013), Audi TT RS (07/2009 –>), Audi RS Q3 (2013 ->), Audi RS3 (2015 ->), KTM X-Bow GTX (2020 ->), KTM X-Bow GT2 Concept (2020 ->), Cupra Formentor (2021->)
references

awards

was winner of the "2.0-litre 2.5-litre" category in the 2010, 2011, 2012, 2013 and 2014 annual competition for International Engine of the Year.

Six-cylinder petrols

2.5 VR6 24v TSI (EA390)
This 2.5 VR6 engine is only available for Chinese market on Volkswagen Teramont. It is derived from now retired 3.0 VR6 engine, which also was available in China only. This Engine is also available in the Volkswagen Talagon
identification parts code prefix: 03H, ID Code: DDKA, DPKA
engine displacement & engine configuration  10.6° VR6; bore x stroke: , stroke ratio: 1:1 – square-stroke, 415.3 cc per cylinder, compression ratio is not disclosed at the moment.
cylinder block & crankcase grey cast iron; die-forged steel crankshaft;
cylinder head & valvetrain cast aluminium alloy; four unequal-length valves per cylinder, 24 valves total, low-friction roller finger cam followers with automatic hydraulic valve clearance compensation, simplex roller chain-driven double overhead camshaft (DOHC – one camshaft for all exhaust valves, and one for all intake valves), continuous timing adjustment variable valve timing (52 degrees on the inlet, 22 degrees on the exhaust)
aspiration single turbo charger from MHI (Mitsubishi Heavy Industries), hot-film air mass meter, electronic drive by wire throttle valve, two-piece cast aluminium alloy intake manifold, two cast iron exhaust manifolds
fuel system Fuel Stratified Injection (FSI) high-pressure direct injection with two common rails
DIN-rated motive power & torque outputs, ID codes
  at 6,000 rpm;  at 2,750-3,500 rpm - DDKA, DPKA
production Volkswagen Salzgitter Plant
applications
 DDKA: Volkswagen Teramont, Chinese market only, China 5 emission standard.
 DPKA: Volkswagen Teramont X, Volkswagen Teramont, Chinese market only, China 6b(stage of PN11 without RDE) emission standard.

2.8 V6 30v 
identification parts code prefix: 078, ID codes: ACK, AGE, AHA, ALG, AMX, APR, AQD, ATQ, ATX, BBG
engine displacement & engine configuration  90° V6 engine; bore x stroke: , stroke ratio: 0.95:1 – undersquare/long-stroke, 461.9 cc per cylinder, compression ratio: 10.1:1 (AGE, ATX, BBG); 10.3:1 (ALG, AMX), 10.6:1 (ACK, AHA, APR, AQD, ATQ)
cylinder block & crankcase cast steel; die-forged steel crankshaft
cylinder heads & valvetrain cast aluminium alloy; five valves per cylinder, 30 valves total, hydraulic bucket tappets with automatic valve clearance compensation, belt-driven double overhead camshafts (exhaust cams are belt driven, intake cams are driven by the exhaust cams using short chains), continuously adjusting variable valve timing for intake camshafts
engine management Bosch Motronic electronic engine control unit (ECU); regular premium unleaded (98 octane normally or 95 with "lower power output", according to manual)
DIN-rated motive power & torque output, ID codes
  at 6,000 rpm;  at 3,200 rpm  — AGE
  at 6,000 rpm;  at 3,200 rpm  — ATX, BBG
  at 6,000 rpm;  at 3,200 rpm  — ALG, AMX
  at 6,000 rpm;  at 3,200 rpm  — ACK, AHA, APR, AQD, ATQ
applications Volkswagen Passat (1997–2005) including the Variant and Chinese Škoda Superb; Audi A4, Audi A6 and Audi A8

2.8 V6 24v FSI
The 2.8 V6 is a stroke-reduced version of the 3.2 V6 FSI introducing the Audi valvelift variable control of inlet valve lift.
identificationparts code prefix: ???, ID code: BDX
engine displacement & engine configuration  90° V6 engine,  cylinders banks offset; bore x stroke: , stroke ratio: 1.03:1 – oversquare/short-stroke, 462.1 cc per cylinder, compression ratio: 12.0:1
cylinder heads & valvetrain cast aluminium alloy; four valves per cylinder, 24 valves total, low-friction roller finger cam followers with automatic hydraulic valve clearance compensation, chain-driven double overhead camshaft, continuous adjusting variable valve timing for intake and exhaust camshafts, two-stage valvelift inlet valve lift variable control
fuel system common rail Fuel Stratified Injection (FSI) high-pressure direct injection
dimensions 
DIN-rated motive power & torque output
  at 5,500 rpm;  at 3,000–5,000 rpm
  at 5,250 rpm;  at 3,000–5,000 rpm
  at 5,500 rpm;  at 3,000–5,000 rpm; 6,800 rpm max
  at 5,750 rpm;  at 3,200–5,000 rpm
applications C6/C7 Audi A6, C7 Audi A7, D3 Audi A8
reference

3.0 V6 30v
This engine unveiled in 2000 is an all-aluminium alloy, longer stroke version of the 2.8 V6.
identification parts code prefix: 06C
engine displacement & engine configuration  90° V6 engine; bore x stroke: , stroke ratio: 0.89:1 – undersquare/long-stroke, 496.1 cc per cylinder, compression ratio: 10.5:1
cylinder block & crankcase cast aluminium alloy; die-forged steel crankshaft; light pistons, balancer shaft
cylinder heads & valvetrain cast aluminium alloy; five valves per cylinder, 30 valves total, hydraulic bucket tappets with automatic valve clearance compensation, belt-driven double overhead camshaft, continuous adjusting variable valve timing for intake and exhaust camshafts
aspiration two-position variable length intake manifold
engine management Bosch Motronic ME 7.1.1 with electronic throttle control, EU4 compliant
DIN-rated motive power & torque outputs, ID codes
BBJ:  for the C6 A6
AVK:  at 6,300 rpm;  at 3,200 rpm
applications 2002–2005 Audi A4, 2002–2004 Audi A6, 2005 Audi A6 (some Far East markets)
reference

3.0 V6 24v TFSI (EA837)
identification parts code prefix: 06E, ID codes: CAJA, CAKA, CCBA, CMUA
engine displacement & engine configuration  90° V6 engine; bore x stroke: , stroke ratio: 0.95:1 – undersquare/long-stroke, 499.7 cc per cylinder,  cylinder spacing, compression ratio: 10.3:1
cylinder block & crankcase cast aluminium alloy; die-forged steel crossplane crankshaft
cylinder heads & valvetrain cast aluminium alloy; four valves per cylinder, 24 valves total, low-friction roller finger cam followers with automatic hydraulic valve clearance compensation, chain-driven double overhead camshaft, continuous adjusting variable valve timing for intake and exhaust camshafts
aspiration Eaton 'Twin Vortices Series' (TVS) Roots-type positive displacement supercharger compressor with 160-degree axial twist twin four-lobe rotors and two integrated water-cooled charge air coolers (one per cylinder bank), mounted within the Vee pumping charged air directly into the inlet manifold
ignition system and engine management mapped direct ignition with centrally mounted spark plugs and six individual direct-acting single spark coils; Siemens Simos 8.xx electronic engine control unit (ECU)
exhaust system two ceramic catalytic converters
dimensions length: , width: , mass: 
DIN-rated motive power & torque outputs
  at 4,780–6,500 rpm;  at 2,150–4,780 rpm — CMUA: Audi A4, Audi A5, Audi Q5
  at 4,850–6,500 rpm;  at 2,500–4,800 rpm — CAJA: Audi A6 (C6)
  at 5,500–7,000 rpm;  at 2,500–5,000 rpm — CAKA/CCBA: Audi S4 (B8), Audi S5, Audi Q7 (4M)
  at 6,000–6,500 rpm;  at 4,000–4,500 rpm — CTXA: Audi SQ5#B8(8R), 
applications2009 Audi A8 (D3), Audi A6 (C6), Audi A6 (C7), Audi A7 (C7), Audi A4 (B8), Audi S5, Audi S4 (B8), 2010 VW Touareg Hybrid (anticipated),  2011 Porsche Cayenne S Hybrid,  2015-2019 Audi Q7 (4M), 2013 Audi SQ5#(8R/B8), 2016 Volkswagen Phideon
references

3.0/2.9 V6 24v TFSI (EA839)
The base engine is the  3.0 TFSI, available on Audi S4/S5/SQ5 models and a slightly detuned version with 48V mild hybrid system on various Audi models such as the A6, A7, A8, Q7 and Q8. The 2.9 TFSI engine is a shorter stroke variant with much higher output.
identification parts code prefix:???, ID codes: CWGD, CZSE/DR, DECA
engine displacement & engine configuration
 3.0 TFSI variant:  90° V6; bore x stroke: , stroke ratio: 0.94:1 - undersquare/long-stroke, compression ratio: 11.2:1
 2.9 TFSI variant:  90° V6; bore x stroke: , stroke ratio: 0.98:1 - undersquare/long-stroke, compression ratio: 10.0:1 to 10.5:1 depending on models
cylinder block & crankcase sand-cast Alusil aluminium-silicon alloy; atmospheric plasma sprayed coating on cylinder walls
cylinder head & valvetrain cast aluminium alloy; four valves per cylinder, 24 valves total, DOHC, continuous timing adjustment on both intake and exhaust camshaft(from 130 degrees up to 180 degrees), 2-stage(6mm and 10mm) Audi Valvelift System(AVS) on the intake sides
aspiration
 all variants feature both Otto and Miller cycles, achieved from valve timing; hot-film air mass meter; electronic drive by wire throttle valve; exhaust manifold integrated into cylinder head; hot-V configuration
 3.0 TFSI: twin-scroll single-turbo charged
 2.9 TFSI: twin-turbo charged
fuel system common rail Fuel Stratified Injection (FSI) high-pressure direct injection
DIN-rated motive power & torque outputs, ID codes
 3.0 TFSI variants
  at 5,400-6,400 rpm;  at 1,340-4,900 rpm - unknown/Porsche variant
  at 5,000-6,400 rpm;  at 1,370-4,500 rpm - CZSE(2017-2018)/DR(2019-)
  at 5,400-6,400 rpm;  at 1,370-4,500 rpm - CWGD
 2.9 TFSI variants
  at 5,250-6,500 rpm;  at 1,750-5,000 rpm - unknown/Porsche variant
  at 5,650-6,600 rpm;  at 1,750-5,500 rpm - unknown/Porsche variant
  at 5,700-6,700 rpm;  at 1,900-5,000 rpm - DECA
production Audi Hungaria Zrt. in Győr
applications
 3.0 TFSI(): Porsche Panamera/Panamera 4 (2nd gen)
 2.9 TFSI(): Porsche Panamera 4 E-Hybrid (2nd gen)
 CZSE/DR: Audi A6 (C8), Audi A7 (C8/4K8), Audi A8 (D5), Audi Q8, Porsche Cayenne/Cayenne E-Hybrid (3rd gen), Volkswagen Touareg (3rd gen)
 CWGD: Audi S4 (B9, B9.5 excluding European models), Audi S5 (B9/F5, B9.5 excluding European models), Audi SQ5 (FY, excluding European facelited models)
 2.9 TFSI(): Porsche Panemera 4S (2nd gen), Porsche Cayenne S (3rd gen)
 DECA: Audi RS4 (B9), Audi RS5 (B9/F5), Audi S6 (C8, excluding European models), Audi S7 (C8/4K8, excluding European models)
references
 audi.de
 porsche.com
 volkswagen.de

3.2 VR6 24v 
This VR6 engine was often badged as a "V6" in Audi models
identification parts code prefix: 022, ID codes: CBRA
engine displacement & engine configuration  15° VR6 engine; bore x stroke: , stroke ratio: 0.88:1 – undersquare/long-stroke, 531.5 cc per cylinder, compression ratio: 11.3:1
cylinder block & crankcase grey cast iron; seven main bearings; die-forged steel crankshaft, cast aluminium alloy oil sump
cylinder head & valvetrain cast aluminium alloy; four unequal-length valves per cylinder, 24 valves total, low-friction roller finger cam followers with automatic hydraulic valve clearance compensation, simplex roller chain-driven double overhead camshaft (DOHC – one camshaft for all exhaust valves, and one for all intake valves), continuous timing adjustment variable valve timing (52 degrees on the inlet, 22 degrees on the exhaust)
aspiration hot-film air mass meter, electronic drive by wire throttle valve, one piece plastic with variable runner length switching by way of an ecu controlled valve intake manifold, two cast iron exhaust manifolds
fuel system, ignition system, engine management common rail multi-point electronic sequential indirect fuel injection with six intake manifold-sited fuel injectors; mapped direct ignition with six NGK longlife spark plugs and six individual single spark coils; electronic engine control unit (ECU)
EWG-rated motive power, ID code & application  — BMF — Volkswagen Industrial Motor (LPG) (05/04->)
DIN-rated motive power & torque outputs, ID codes & applications
  at 6,200 rpm;  at 3,200 rpm — BDL — Volkswagen Transporter (T5)
 at 6,200 rpm;  at 2,950 rpm — BKK — Volkswagen Transporter (T5)
  at 6,200 rpm;  at 2,500–3,000 rpm — BFH — VW Golf Mk4 R32 (US)
  at 6,250 rpm;  at 2,800–3,200 rpm — BML — VW Golf Mk4 R32 (Australia)
  at 6,300 rpm;  at 2,500–3,000 rpm — BDB, BHE, BMJ, BPF, BUB — Audi A3 (BDB: 07/03-08/04, BMJ: 09/04-10/05, BUB: 11/05-05/09), Audi TT (BHE: 07/03-06/06, BPF: 05/04-05/06, BUB: 08/06-06/10), VW Golf Mk5 R32, Porsche Cayenne
references

3.2 VR6 24v FSI (EA390)
identification parts code prefix: 03H, ID code: AXZ
engine displacement & engine configuration  10.6° VR6 engine; bore:  x stroke: 90.9mm, stroke ratio: 0.95:1 – undersquare/long-stroke, 531.5 cc per cylinder, compression ratio: 12:1
cylinder block & crankcase grey cast iron; seven main bearings; die-forged steel crankshaft
cylinder head & valvetrain cast aluminium alloy; four unequal-length valves per cylinder, 24 valves total, low-friction roller finger cam followers with automatic hydraulic valve clearance compensation, simplex roller chain-driven double overhead camshaft (DOHC – one camshaft for all exhaust valves, and one for all intake valves), continuous timing adjustment variable valve timing (52 degrees on the inlet, 22 degrees on the exhaust)
aspiration hot-film air mass meter, electronic drive by wire throttle valve, one-piece cast aluminium alloy intake manifold, two cast iron exhaust manifolds
fuel system Fuel Stratified Injection (FSI) high-pressure direct injection with two common rails
ignition system mapped direct ignition with six individual ignition coils
DIN-rated motive power & torque output 
application VW Passat B6 3.2 FSI (09/05->), VW Phaeton

3.2 (Technically – 3.1 L) V6 24v FSI
identificationparts code prefix: ???, ID codes: AUK, BKH, BYU, (191 kW – BPK)
engine configuration 90° V6 engine;  cylinder spacing, compression ratio: 12.5:1 (184 kW: 11.3:1)
engine displacement etc.
; bore x stroke: , stroke ratio: 0.91:1 – undersquare/long-stroke, 520.4 cc per cylinder
; bore x stroke: , stroke ratio: 0.92:1 – undersquare/long-stroke, 532.8 cc per cylinder
cylinder block & crankcase homogeneous monoblock low-pressure chill gravity die cast hypereutectic 'Alusil' aluminium-silicon alloy (AlSi17Cu4Mg) with a closed-deck design, mechanically stripped hard silicon crystal integral liners, honed under simulated mechanical stress; die-forged steel crankshaft
cylinder heads & valvetrain cast aluminium alloy; four valves per cylinder, 24 valves total, low-friction roller finger cam followers with automatic hydraulic valve clearance compensation, chain-driven double overhead camshaft, continuous adjusting variable valve timing for intake and exhaust camshafts
fuel system common rail Fuel Stratified Injection (FSI) high-pressure direct injection between 
aspiration & exhaust system variable intake manifold, two ceramic catalytic converters
dimensions length: , width: , mass: 
DIN-rated motive power & torque outputs
 at 6,300 rpm;  at 2,500–3,000 rpm
 at 6,500 rpm;  at 3,250 rpm, 90% available between 1,900–5,900 rpm, 7,200 rpm max — Audi A6
 at 6,500 rpm — Audi A8
 at 6,500 rpm;  at 3,200–5,000 rpm — Audi A4, Audi A5
applications 2005 Audi A8, Audi A6, Audi A4, Audi A5
references

3.6 VR6 24v FSI (EA390)
identification parts code prefix: 03H
engine displacement & engine configuration  10.6° VR6 engine; bore x stroke: , stroke ratio: 0.92:1 – undersquare/long-stroke, 599.7 cc per cylinder, compression ratio: 11.4–12.0:1
cylinder block & crankcase grey cast iron; die-forged steel crankshaft
cylinder head & valvetrain cast aluminium alloy; four unequal-length valves per cylinder, 24 valves total, low-friction roller finger cam followers with automatic hydraulic valve clearance compensation, simplex roller chain-driven double overhead camshaft (DOHC – one camshaft for all exhaust valves, and one for all intake valves), continuous timing adjustment variable valve timing (52 degrees on the inlet, 22 degrees on the exhaust)
aspiration hot-film air mass meter, electronic drive by wire throttle valve, two-piece cast aluminium alloy intake manifold, two cast iron exhaust manifolds
fuel system Fuel Stratified Injection (FSI) high-pressure direct injection with two common rails
DIN-rated motive power & torque outputs, ID codes
  at 6,000 rpm;  at 2,500–5000 rpm; Compression Ratio: 11.4:1 — CDVA — Škoda Superb 4x4 DSG and Volkswagen Eos 3.6
 at 6,200 rpm;  at 2,750 rpm; — BLV — Volkswagen Passat (B6 and B7) (North America and Middle-East only)
 at 6,200 rpm;  at 2,500–5000 rpm; — CDVB — Volkswagen Passat (NMS) (North America and Middle-East only)
 at 6,200 rpm;  at 2,500–5000 rpm; — CDVC/CDVD — Volkswagen Atlas (North America, Russia and Middle-East)
 at 6,200 rpm;  at 3,500 rpm; — CHNA/CMVA — Volkswagen Phaeton
 at 6,200 rpm;  at 3,500 rpm; — CGRA/CMTA — Volkswagen Touareg 
 at 6,600 rpm;  at 2,400–5,300 rpm — BWS — Volkswagen Passat R36 (B6) (Europe, Japan, Australia, New Zealand, Middle-East)
 at 6,600 rpm;  at 2,400–5300 rpm; — CNNA — Volkswagen CC (North America, Russia and Middle-East)
applications VW Passat B6 3.6 FSI (BLV: 09/05->, BWS: 04/07-05/07), VW Passat CC (BLV: 06/08->, BWS: 05/08->, CNNA: 01/12->), VW Phaeton, VW Touareg, Porsche Cayenne, Audi Q7
references

Eight-cylinder petrols

Of their eight-cylinder petrol engines, all Volkswagen Group V8 engines are primarily constructed from a lightweight cast aluminium alloy cylinder block (crankcase) and cylinder heads. They all use multi-valve technology, with the valves being operated by two overhead camshafts per cylinder bank (sometimes referred to as 'quad cam'). All functions of engine control are carried out by varying types of Robert Bosch GmbH Motronic electronic engine control units.

These V8 petrol engines initially were only used in cars bearing the Audi marque, but are now also installed in Volkswagen Passenger Cars 'premium models'. They are all longitudinally orientated, and with the exception of the Audi R8, are front-mounted.

4.2 V8 FSI 32v

Based on the existing Audi 40 valve V8, this new engine is heavily revised over its predecessor, with all-new components including: crankshaft, connecting rods and pistons, cylinder heads and valvetrain, oil and cooling system, intake and exhaust system, and engine management system. It is available in two versions; a basic or 'comfort' version, first used in the Audi Q7; and a sports-focussed high-revving version, with features borrowed from motorsport, for the B7 RS 4 quattro and the R8. This is the first eight-cylinder road car engine to use Fuel Stratified Injection (FSI), which was successfully developed by Audi in their Le Mans winning R8 racing car. The 5.2 V10 FSI was developed directly from this V8 engine.
identification parts code prefix/variant: 079.D
displacement & configuration  90° V8 engine;  cylinder bank offset;  cylinder spacing; bore and stroke: , stroke ratio: 0.91:1 – undersquare/long-stroke, 520.4 cc per cylinder, compression ratio: 12.5:1, firing order: 1–5–4–8–6–3–7–2; water:oil lubricant cooler (RS 4/R8 utilises an additional thermostatically controlled air:oil cooler); Q7 and RS 4 utilise a wet sump system (RS 4 with additional longitudinal axis flapped baffles controlled by lateral g-force), R8 uses dry sump
cylinder block & crankcase homogeneous monoblock low-pressure chill gravity die casting hypereutectic 'Alusil' aluminium-silicon alloy (AlSi17Cu4Mg) with a closed-deck design, mechanically stripped hard silicon crystal integral liners, honed under simulated mechanical stress; reinforced by a cast lower crankcase alloy bedplate (AlSi17Cu4Mg) mimicking a ladder-frame design, and including five GGG50 nodular cast iron press-fit main bearing caps each attached by four bolts;  overall length,  cylinder block height; two-stage 3/8" simplex roller chain and gear driven 'accessory drive' which includes the oil pump, water pump, power steering pump, and air conditioning compressor; baffle-plate sump
cylinder heads & valvetrain cast aluminium alloy, partition-plate horizontally divided intake ports producing a tumble effect (larger cross-section on RS 4/R8); four valves per cylinder: chrome-plated solid-stem (hollow-stem on RS 4/R8) intake valves, and chrome-plated sodium-filled hollow-stem exhaust valves, both with  valve lift (longer valve lift on RS 4/R8), 32 valves total; lightweight low-friction roller finger cam followers (uprated with peened rollers on RS 4/R8) with automatic hydraulic valve clearance compensation, double overhead camshafts (each a hollow tube composite) on each cylinder bank, driven from the flywheel side via a two-stage chain drive using three 3/8" simplex roller chains (sleeve-type on RS 4/R8), valve opening (in crank angle degrees) 200 intake (230 for RS 4/R8) and 210 e exhaust (230 for RS 4/R8); valve overlap facilitates integral exhaust gas recirculation; continuous hydraulic vane-adjustable variable valve timing for intake and exhaust camshafts with up to 42 degrees adjustment, each controlled via information from Hall sensors, Audi "RS" 'red' plastic cam covers on RS 4, 'anthracite' plastic on R8
aspiration two single-entry air filters each with hot-film air mass flow meters (Q7), or triple-entry single air filter with single hot-film air mass meter (RS 4), or double-entry dual-element single air filter with two hot-film air mass flow meters (R8); single (Q7 & RS 4) or twin (R8) cast alloy throttle body electronically controlled Bosch E-Gas throttle valves (Bosch  diameter on Q7, Pierburg  diameter on RS4), two-stage four-piece gravity die-cast (Q7) (sand-cast on RS 4/R8) magnesium-aluminium alloy variable length intake manifold with electronically map-controlled silicon tipped tract-length flaps along with tumble flaps inducing a swirling movement in the drawn air (RS 4 & R8 do not use a variable tract-length intake manifold)
ignition system & engine management mapped direct ignition with centrally mounted longlife spark plugs and eight individual direct-acting single spark coils; Bosch Motronic MED 9.1.1 electronic engine control unit (ECU) (two MED 9.1 ECUs in the RS 4 and R8, working on the 'master and slave' concept due to the high revving nature of the engine), four knock sensors, EU4 emissions standard, map-controlled coolant thermostat (Q7 only), additional electric after-run coolant pump with two additional side-mounted radiators (RS 4/R8), water-cooled alternator, two map-controlled radiator fans
exhaust system vacuum-controlled secondary air injection to assist cold start operation; air-gap insulated exhaust manifold per cylinder bank (Q7), or 4-into-2-into-1 fan-branch exhaust manifold per cylinder bank to minimise reverse pulsation of expelled exhaust gases (RS 4), or fan branch manifold with integrated catalytic converter per cylinder bank; two close-coupled and two main underfloor catalytic converters – ceramic on Q7, high-flow metallic on RS 4, or main catalytic converter integrated into transverse main rear silencer with quad outlets; four heated oxygen (lambda) sensors (broadband upstream, nonlinear downstream) monitoring pre- and post-catalyst exhaust gases; siamesed absorption-type middle silencer (Q7 with crossover) and siamesed rear silencer, separate rear silencers on RS 4 with vacuum-operated flap valves
dimensions Q7 (for auto transmission with plate-type flywheel): approx. , RS4 (for 6-speed manual with dual-mass flywheel): approx. 
DIN-rated power & torque outputs, ID codes, applications
  at 6,800 rpm;  at 3,500 rpm, 85% available from 2,000 rpm — BAR: Audi Q7 (03/06-05/10), Volkswagen Touareg (06/06-05/10); BVJ: Audi C6 A6 (05/06-08/11), Audi D3 A8 (06/06-07/10)
  at 7,000 rpm — CAU: Audi S5 (06/07-03/12)
  at 7,800 rpm;  at 5,500 rpm, 90% available between 2,250 and 7,600 rpm, 8,250 rpm rev limiter — BNS: Audi RS 4 (B7) (09/05-06/08); BYH: Audi R8 (04/07-09/10)
references

Awards
was placed in the 2005 and 2006 annual list of Ward's 10 Best Engines

4.2 V8 40v
identification parts code prefix: 079
engine displacement & engine configuration  90° V8 engine;  cylinder spacing; bore x stroke: , stroke ratio: 1.1:1 – undersquare/long-stroke, 521.5 cc per cylinder
cylinder block & crankcase homogeneous monobloc low-pressure gravity die cast hypereutectic 'Alusil' aluminium-silicon alloy (AlSi17Cu4Mg) with a closed-deck design, mechanically stripped hard silicon crystal integral liners, honed under simulated mechanical stress; five main bearings; die-forged steel crankshaft
cylinder heads & valvetrain cast aluminium alloy, five valves per cylinder, 40 valves total; lightweight low-friction roller cam followers with automatic hydraulic valve clearance compensation, roller chain-driven double overhead camshafts
aspiration synthetic material two-stage variable intake manifold
fuel system & engine management two linked common rail fuel distributor rails, multi-point electronic sequential indirect fuel injection with eight intake manifold-sited fuel injectors; Bosch Motronic ME 7.1.1. electronic engine control unit (ECU); 98 RON/ROZ (93 AKI) EuroSuperPlus (premium) unleaded recommended for maximum performance and fuel economy
exhaust system two multi-stage catalytic converters
dimensions length: , mass: 
DIN-rated motive power & torque outputs, ID codes
  at 6,600 rpm;  at 3,500 rpm, 6,800 rpm max — Audi A6, BAT,  A8:  BFM (BFM engine is belt driven)
  at 6,200 rpm;  at 2,700–4,600 rpm, 6,500 rpm max — Audi A6 allroad: BAS
  at 7,000 rpm;  at 3,500 rpm — Audi S4: BBK (03/03-03/09)
  at 7,200 rpm;  at 3,000 rpm — Audi S4: BHF (03/03-03/09 – US/Korea only)
  at 6,500 rpm;  at 2,800-3,700 rpm — Volkswagen Phaeton: BGH, BGJ (Belt driven)
applications Audi B6 S4, Audi B7 S4, Audi C5 A6 allroad (BAS: 07/02-08/05), Audi C6 A6 (BAT: 05/04-05/06), Audi A8 (BFM: 10/02-07/10), Volkswagen Phaeton (BGJ: 05/03-07/03, BGH: 08/03-05/10)
reference

Awards
was placed in the 2004 annual list of Ward's 10 Best Engines

4.0 TFSI
This engine is part of Audi's modular 90° V6/V8 engine family. It shares its bore and stroke, 90° V-angle, and 90mm cylinder spacing with the Audi V6. The earlier V6 engines (EA837) used an Eaton TVS Supercharger instead of turbocharger(s). In 2016, Audi and Porsche released a new turbocharged V6 engine they dubbed EA839. These 2.9L (biturbo) & 3.0L (single turbo) V6 engines share the 4.0T TFSI V8's “hot vee” design, meaning the turbo(s) are placed in the Vee of the engine (between each bank of cylinders) instead of on the outside of each cylinder bank. This allows the turbocharger(s) to produce boost pressure more quickly as the path the exhaust gases travel is much reduced. It also aids in getting the engine's emissions hardware up to temperature more quickly. As with the V6, the V8 is used in various Audi and Porsche models, but the V8 also finds use in Bentley and Lamborghini vehicles.

engine displacement & engine configuration  90° V8 engine;  cylinder spacing; bore x stroke: , stroke ratio: 0.95:1 – undersquare/long-stroke, 499.1 cc per cylinder, compression ratio: 10.5:1
fuel system; Fuel Stratified Injection (FSI) Central-Overhead Injectors
exhaust system two twin-scroll turbo chargers and twin air- and water-cooled intercoolers
DIN-rated motive power & torque outputs, ID codes, applications
  at 5,500 rpm;  from 1,400 rpm to 5,400 rpm— CEUC: Audi S6 C7, S7, CEUA: A8 D4
  at 5,800 rpm;  from 1,400 rpm to 5,300 rpm— CTGA: A8 D4, A8 D5
  at 6,200 rpm;  from 1,700 rpm to 5,500 rpm— DDTA: Audi S8 D4 (overboost to 750 Nm), CWUC: Audi RS7 performance(C7), Audi RS6 performance (C7)
  at 5,700 rpm;  from 1,750 rpm to 5,500 rpm— CRDB, CWUB: Audi RS6 C7 and RS7 C7
  at 5,500 rpm;  from 1,800 rpm to 4,500 rpm— CXYA: A8 D5, Porsche Panamera GTS
  at 5,500 rpm;  from 1,800 rpm to 4,500 rpm in Porsche Panamera GTS (Facelifted)
  at 6,000 rpm;  from 1,700 rpm to 5,400 rpm in Bentley Continental GT V8 and Flying Spur V8
  at 6,000 rpm;  at 1,750 rpm to 5,500 rpm in Bentley Continental GT V8 S
  at 5,500 rpm;  from 2,000 rpm to 4,000 rpm in Audi SQ7 and SQ8
  from 5,750 rpm to 6,000 rpm;  from 1,960 rpm to 4,500 rpm in Porsche Panamera Turbo, Turbo S E-Hybrid, Bentley Continental GT V8 (2019–) and Flying Spur (2019-)
  at 6,000 rpm;   from 2,050 rpm to 4,500 rpm in Audi S8 D5
  from 5,750 rpm to 6,000 rpm;  from 1,960 rpm to 4,500 rpm in Porsche Panamera Turbo S E-Hybrid (Facelifted)
  from 6,000 rpm to 6,250 rpm;  from 2,050 rpm to 4,500 rpm in Audi RS6 C8 and RS7 C8
  at 6,000 rpm;  from 2,200 rpm to 4,500 rpm in Audi RS Q8
  at 6,000 rpm;  from 2,300 rpm to 4,500 rpm in Audi RS6 Avant performance (C8) and RS7 performance (C8)
  from 5,750 rpm to 6,000 rpm;  from 1,960 rpm to 4,500 rpm in Porsche Panamera Turbo S
  at 6,000 rpm;  in Lamborghini Urus
  at 6,000 rpm;  in Porsche Cayenne Coupé Turbo GT

Audi version of the engine includes electronic monitoring of the oil level, while Bentley engine includes a dipstick for oil check. In addition, the Bentley engine uses switchable hydraulic mounts instead of Audi's active electrohydraulic engine mounts.

6.75 V8 biturbo (Bentley)
This 6.75 litre V8 is a legacy engine, developed by Rolls-Royce Limited before the takeover of Bentley Motors Limited by the German Volkswagen Group, but still used during their ownership.

engine displacement & engine configuration  90° V8 engine; bore x stroke: , stroke ratio: 1.05:1 – oversquare/short-stroke, 843.5 cc per cylinder
cylinder block & crankcase cast aluminium alloy, single central camshaft
cylinder heads & valvetrain cast aluminium alloy, two valves per cylinder, 16 valves total, overhead valve (OHV) with pushrods
aspiration biturbo – one turbocharger per cylinder bank
DIN-rated motive power & torque outputs
  at 4,100 rpm;  at 3,250 rpm
  at 4,200 rpm;  at 3,300 rpm — R
  at ?,??? rpm;  — Bentley Brooklands, Bentley Mulsanne Speed
applications 2005 Bentley Arnage, 2006 Bentley Azure, 2008 Bentley Brooklands, 2010 Bentley Mulsanne
references German press release: auto katalog 2006; auto, motor und sport

Ten-cylinder petrols

5.0 V10 40v TFSI (Audi C6 RS6)
This 'Audi V10 TFSI' – a 5.0 litre V10 'biturbo' petrol engine is one of the most powerful engines fitted into any Volkswagen Group automobile.
identification parts code prefix/variant: 07L.B, ID code: BUH
engine displacement & engine configuration  90° V10 engine; bore x stroke: , stroke ratio: 0.95:1 – undersquare/long-stroke, 499.1 cc per cylinder, compression ratio: 10.5:1; dry sump lubrication system, simplex roller chain and gear-driven external ancillaries including combined oil pump and centrifugal coolant pump, two oil coolers – oil:water and thermostatically controlled oil:air, water-cooled alternator
cylinder block & crankcase homogeneous monoblock low-pressure chill die cast hypereutectic 'Alusil' aluminium-silicon alloy (AlSi17Cu4Mg); reinforced by a cast alloy bedplate with six integral GGG50 grey cast iron main bearing caps each affixed by four bolts, web-reinforced inner vee; inner-vee balance shaft eliminating first degree inertial forces,  cylinder bore spacing,  cylinder bank offset; die-forged steel crossplane crankshaft with pins shared by opposing pistons (contrary to the 5.2 V10 from the S6), cast aluminium alloy oil sump
cylinder heads & valvetrain cast aluminium alloy; partition-plate horizontally divided intake ports designed to induce swirl-effect during induction stroke, four valves per cylinder, 40 valves total, low-friction roller finger cam followers with automatic hydraulic valve clearance compensation, double overhead camshaft driven from the rear flywheel end in a relay method using four roller chains, continuous adjusting variable valve timing for intake and exhaust camshafts, plastic-composite cam covers
ignition system & engine management mapped direct ignition with centrally mounted spark plugs and ten individual direct-acting single spark coils; two Bosch Motronic ME 9.1.2 electronic engine control units (ECUs) working on the master/slave concept due to the high rev limit
exhaust system two close-coupled and two main underfloor catalytic converters, eight lambda sensors
DIN-rated motive power & torque outputBUH:  at 6,250–6,700 rpm;  at 1,500–6,250 rpm
application Audi C6 RS6 5.0 TFSI quattro (04/08-08/10)
reference ,

5.2 V10 40v FSI (C6 S6/D3 S8)
A first in Audi's history, this new generation high-performance V10 engine is based on Audi's V8 FSI engines, and retains the same fundamental design principals of the V8 FSI, including the crankcase, cylinder heads, valvetrain, fuel system and intake manifold. However, an all new crankshaft, balance shaft, double-chambered intake manifold with dual throttle valves, exhaust manifold, and ECU—are all unique to the V10. As part of the new V10 engine development, specific emphasis was placed on 'refinement', 'comfort' and 'sportiness' – as required for installation in Audi high-performance luxury cars. As well as gaining two additional cylinders compared to the V8, it has been bored by an extra two millimetres, and also shares the 90 degree (°) cylinder bank angle of the recent Audi V engines. Audi continue to use the Fuel Stratified Injection (FSI) technology, originally developed in the Audi R8 LMP endurance race cars.

This engine is often, but incorrectly, referred to as a derivative of the Gallardo's original 5.0-litre Lamborghini V10, which was also developed under the Volkswagen Group ownership. However, the subsequent 5.2 V10 FSI installed in the Gallardo LP560 and Audi R8 V10 is fundamentally identical to this Audi unit, save for a stronger crankshaft with solid main pin design, forged pistons, dry sump oiling system, different intake and exhaust valves, and engine management systems.
identification parts code prefix: 07L
engine displacement & engine configuration  90° V10 engine; bore x stroke: , stroke ratio: 0.91:1 – undersquare/long-stroke, 520.4 cc per cylinder, compression ratio: 12.5:1
crankshaft, connecting rods and pistons die-forged steel crankshaft, with 18 degree crankpin offset to achieve a 72° crank angle even firing interval; high strength cracked trapezoidal connecting rods (36MnVS4); Kolbenschmidt cast aluminium pistons with shaped piston crowns designed to impart charged volume tumbling effect for fully homogenous air/fuel charge, skirt with iron liner
cylinder heads & valvetrain cast aluminium alloy; partition-plate horizontally divided intake ports, four valves per cylinder,  intake valves and  sodium-filled exhaust valves, 40 valves total, low-friction roller finger cam followers with automatic hydraulic valve clearance compensation, hollow tube composite double overhead camshafts driven from the flywheel side via a two-stage chain drive utilising three 3/8" simplex roller chains, continuous vane-adjustable variable valve timing for intake and exhaust camshafts with up to 42 degrees adjustment
aspiration two air filters, two hot-film air mass meters, two cast alloy throttle bodies each with electronically controlled  throttle valves, two-stage four-piece die cast magnesium alloy variable tract-length intake manifold utilising electronically map controlled silicon tipped tract length flaps along with tumble flaps inducing a swirling movement in the drawn air
ignition system & engine management mapped direct ignition with centrally mounted spark plugs and ten individual direct-acting single spark coils; two Bosch Motronic MED 9.1 electronic engine control units (ECUs) working on the 'master and slave' concept due to the high revving nature of the engine, four knock sensors, EU4 emissions standard
exhaust system vacuum-controlled secondary air injection into exhaust ports to assist cold start operation, 2-1-2 branch exhaust manifold per cylinder bank ( nominal length) to minimise reverse pulsation of expelled exhaust gases, four close-coupled 600-cell ceramic catalytic converters, eight heated oxygen (lambda) sensors monitoring pre- and post-catalyst exhaust gases
dimensions approx.  ( less than the BMW S85 with its  bore spacing); length: , width: , height:  with all components
DIN-rated motive power & torque outputs, applications, ID codes
Audi S8 — BSM:  at 7,000 rpm;  at 3,500 rpm (90% available from 2,300 rpm), 21.7 m/s maximum piston speed,  maximum MEP
applications Audi C6 S6 (03/06-08/11), Audi D3 S8 (06/06-07/10)
references

5.2 V10 40v FSI (Gallardo LP560-4/Huracán LP610-4/R8)
This is the second Lamborghini engine developed by AUDI AG, who became owners of Automobili Lamborghini S.p.A. following the takeover of Lamborghini by the German Volkswagen Group. It is a development of Audi's fundamentally identical 5.2 V10 40v FSI engine as used in the Audi C6 S6 and Audi D3 S8. This variant has been de-tuned for the Audi R8 V10.
identification parts code prefix: 07L.Y
engine displacement & engine configuration  90° V10 engine; bore x stroke: , stroke ratio: 0.91:1 – undersquare/long-stroke, 520.4 cc per cylinder; compression ratio: 12.5:1; dry sump lubrication system
cylinder block & crankcase cast aluminium alloy;  cylinder bore spacing; die-forged steel crankshaft with shared crankpins (creating an uneven firing interval of either 54 deg or 90 deg separation)
cylinder heads & valvetrain cast aluminium alloy; four valves per cylinder, 40 valves total, low-friction roller finger cam followers with automatic hydraulic valve clearance compensation, chain driven double overhead camshafts, continuously variable valve timing system both for intake and exhaust
aspiration two air filters, two hot-film air mass meters, two cast alloy throttle bodies each with electronically controlled throttle valves, cast magnesium alloy variable geometry and resonance intake manifold
fuel system fully demand-controlled and returnless; fuel tank–mounted low-pressure fuel pump, Fuel Stratified Injection (FSI): two inlet camshaft double-cam driven single-piston high-pressure injection pumps maintaining pressure in the two stainless steel common rail fuel distributor rails, ten combustion chamber sited direct injection solenoid-controlled sequential fuel injectors
ignition system & engine management mapped direct ignition with centrally mounted spark plugs and ten individual direct-acting single spark coils; two Bosch Motronic MED 9.1 or Lamborghini LIE electronic engine control units (ECUs) working on the 'master and slave' concept due to the high revving nature of the engine
exhaust system 2-1-2 branch exhaust manifold per cylinder bank to minimise reverse pulsation of expelled exhaust gases
DIN-rated motive power & torque outputs, ID,
applications
Audi — BUJ:  at 8,000 rpm;  at 6,500 rpm — Audi R8 V10 (04/09-07/15)
LP550:  at 8,000 rpm;  at 6,500 rpm — Lamborghini Gallardo LP 550-2
LP560:  at 8,000 rpm;  at 6,500 rpm — Lamborghini Gallardo LP 560-4
LP570:  at 8,000 rpm;  at 6,500 rpm — Lamborghini Gallardo LP 570-4 Superleggera, Spyder Performante, Super Trofeo, Squadra Corse
LP580:  at 8,000 rpm;  at 6,500 rpm — Lamborghini Huracán LP 580-2
LP610:  at 8,250 rpm;  at 6,500 rpm — Lamborghini Huracán LP 610-4, EVO RWD, Audi R8 V10 Plus
references

Twelve-cylinder petrols

6.0 WR12 48v

This W12 badged W12 engine is a twelve cylinder W engine of four rows of three cylinders, formed by joining two imaginary 15° VR6 engine cylinder blocks, placed on a single crankshaft, with each cylinder 'double-bank' now at a 72° angle. This specific configuration is more appropriately described as a WR12 engine.

This Volkswagen Group engine is also used with slight modification, and with the addition of two turbochargers in the Bentley Continental GT and Bentley Flying Spur.
identification parts code prefix: 07C
engine displacement & engine configuration  72° W12 engine; bore x stroke: , stroke ratio: 0.93:1 – undersquare/long-stroke, 499.9 cc per cylinder, compression ratio: 10.7:1
cylinder block & crankcase homogeneous monoblock low-pressure chill die cast hypereutectic 'Alusil' aluminium-silicon alloy (AlSi17Cu4Mg); torsionally stiff aluminium alloy crankcase with high-resistance cylinder liners, simplex roller chain driven oil pump; die-forged steel 21.2 kg crankshaft, seven main bearings, crankpins offset to achieve a constant firing order as on a V6 engine
cylinder heads & valvetrain cast aluminium alloy; four valves per cylinder, 48 valves total, low-friction roller finger cam followers with automatic hydraulic valve clearance compensation, double overhead camshaft driven from the flywheel side via a two-stage chain drive utilising three 3/8" simplex roller chains, continuous vane-adjustable variable valve timing for intake and exhaust camshafts with up to 52 degrees timing range for the flow-optimised inlet ports, 22 degrees on the exhaust camshafts
aspiration two air filters, two hot-film air mass meters, two throttle bodies each with electronically controlled Bosch 'E-Gas' throttle valves, four-part two-channel cast magnesium alloy intake manifold; Bentley versions also use twin-turbos – one turbocharger per VR cylinder bank
fuel system, ignition system, engine management two linked common rail fuel distributor rails, multi-point electronic sequential indirect fuel injection with twelve intake manifold-sited fuel injectors; centrally positioned NGK longlife spark plugs, mapped direct ignition with 12 individual direct-acting single spark coils; Bosch Motronic ME 7.1.1 electronic engine control unit (ECU), cylinder-selective knock control via four knock sensors, permanent lambda control, water-cooled alternator
exhaust system two vacuum-controlled secondary air injection pumps for direct injection into exhaust ports to assist cold start operation, four exhaust manifolds with four integrated ceramic catalytic converters, eight heated oxygen sensors monitoring pre- and post catalyst exhaust gases
dimensions length: , height: , width:  then 
DIN-rated motive power & torque outputs – Audi / Volkswagen, ID codes
;  — Audi A8: AZC (01/01-09/02), VW Phaeton: BAN (04/02-05/05)
 at 6,200 rpm,  at 4,000 rpm,  at 2,300–5,300 rpm — Audi A8: BHT, BSB, BTE (12/03-07/10)
 at 6,000 rpm;  at 2,750–5,000 rpm — Phaeton: BRN, BTT (05/05-03/16)
 at 6,000 rpm;  at 3,300 rpm — Touareg: BJN, CFRA (08/04-05/10)
DIN-rated motive power & torque outputs – Bentley twin turbo
 at 6,100 rpm;  at 1,600–6,100 rpm — standard models: BWR, BEB, MTBHT
 at 6,000 rpm;  at 1,700–5,600 rpm — "Speed" models: CKHC, BWRA 
applications Audi A8 (AZC: 03/01-09/02, BHT: 02/04-, BSB: 10/04-, BTE: 02/05-), Volkswagen Phaeton (BAN: 05/02-05/05, BRN: 05/05-10/08, BTT: 05/05-10/08), Volkswagen Touareg sport (BJN: 08/04-, CFRA: 02/08-), Bentley Continental GT, Bentley Flying Spur
references

6.0 WR12 48v TFSI
It would mostly share the same technical specifications with its turbocharged 6.0-liter predecessor, other than the fact that it was modified to meet new WLTP emission standards. This new engine was promised to be made available on the fourth generation A8, following S8 and 60 TFSI/TDI models. However, as of August 2020, only examples of the W12 variant were press cars. It is rumoured that the W12 variant is only available as special orders in selected European dealerships. 
reference

6.3 WR12 48v FSI (CEJA)
This new engine was promised to be made available on the 3rd generation A8 More compact dimensions than a comparable V8 engine FSI direct injection with twin high-pressure fuel pumps, twin fuel rails and six-port high pressure injectors.
applications
A8 L W12 6.3 FSI quattro (CEJA)

6.5 V12 48v (L539) (Lamborghini)
This is a new V12 engine developed for Lamborghini. The company's fourth in-house engine and their first new V12 since its founding, it made its first appearance in the Lamborghini Aventador.

engine configuration 60° V12 engine; dry sump lubrication system
engine displacement etc.
6.5: ; bore x stroke: , compression ratio: 11.8:1
cylinder block & crankcase cast aluminium alloy
cylinder heads & valvetrain cast aluminium alloy; four valves per cylinder, 48 valves total, double overhead camshaft
aspiration two air filters, four cast alloy throttle bodies each with Magneti Marelli electronically controlled throttle valves, cast magnesium alloy intake manifold
fuel system & ignition system two linked common rail fuel distributor rails, multi-point electronic sequential indirect fuel injection with twelve intake manifold-sited fuel injectors; centrally positioned spark plugs, mapped direct ignition with 12 individual direct-acting single spark coils
exhaust system two 3-branch exhaust manifolds per cylinder bank, connected to dual-inlet catalytic converters, heated oxygen (lambda) sensors monitoring pre- and post-catalyst exhaust gases
DIN-rated motive power & torque outputs
applications
Lamborghini Aventador LP 700-4 (2011–)
Lamborghini Aventador LP 720-4 50th Anniversario (2013–)
Lamborghini Veneno LP 750-4 (2013–2014)
Lamborghini Centenario LP 770-4 (2016–2017)
reference

Sixteen-cylinder petrol

8.0 WR16 64v4T (Bugatti)

This W16 badged engine is the first and so far the only production W16 engine in the world. It is a sixteen-cylinder WR engine, of four rows of four cylinders, and is created by joining two VR8-engined 15° cylinder banks at the crankcase, and placed on a single crankshaft, with each cylinder 'double-bank' now at a 90° V-angle. This specific configuration method means it is more appropriately described as a WR16 engine rather than W16.
engine displacement & engine configuration  90° W16 engine; bore x stroke: , stroke ratio: 1.00:1 – 'square engine', 499.56 cc per cylinder
cylinder block & crankcase forged aluminium alloy; plasma-coated cylinder bores, dry sump lubrication system featuring an eight-stage aluminium-geared oil pump, die-forged steel crankshaft, lightweight titanium connecting rods
cylinder heads & valvetrain cast aluminium alloy; four valves per cylinder, 64 valves total, low-friction roller finger cam followers with automatic hydraulic valve clearance compensation, double overhead camshaft
aspiration lightweight cast magnesium alloy intake manifold with twin 'drive by wire' electronically controlled throttle valves in separate throttle bodies, four parallel turbochargers with integrated excess pressure regulation valves, two water-cooled top-mounted intercoolers
fuel system, ignition system & engine management two linked common rail fuel distributor rails, multi-point electronic sequential indirect fuel injection with sixteen intake manifold-sited fuel injectors; mapped direct ignition with 16 individual direct-acting single spark coils; two digital electronic engine control units (ECUs), ion-current knock control and misfire cylinder-selective detection system
dimensions & mass length: , mass: ˜
DIN-rated motive power & torque outputs
  at 6,000 rpm;  at 2,200–5,500 rpm; achieving a top speed of 
 ;  – in the Bugatti Veyron Super Sport; achieving a top speed of 
application

references

Petrol engines data table
The following table contains a very brief selection of current and historical Volkswagen Group spark-ignition petrol engines for comparison of performance and operating characteristics:

See also
 List of Volkswagen Group diesel engines
Wasserboxer
VR6 engine
G-Lader
G60 – for detailed development info and progression of forced induction in Volkswagen Group engines

References

External links
VolkswagenAG.com – Volkswagen Group corporate website
Chemnitz (Germany) – engine plant Mobility and Sustainability
Kassel (Germany) – engine plant Mobility and Sustainability
Salzgitter (Germany) – engine plant Mobility and Sustainability
Polkowice (Poland) – engine plant Mobility and Sustainability
São Carlos (Brazil) – engine plant Mobility and Sustainability
Shanghai (China) – engine plant Mobility and Sustainability
Audi at a glance – includes information on the Győr engine plant 
Golf R400 (EA888)

Gasoline engines by model
Lists of automobile engines
Slanted engines